= High-entropy-alloy nanoparticles =

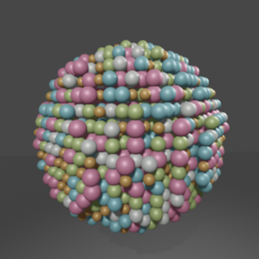
Schematic of a high-entropy alloy nanoparticle with 5 types of atoms with different sizes.

High-entropy-alloy nanoparticles (HEA-NPs) are nanoparticles having five or more elements alloyed in a single-phase solid solution structure, such as fcc Cantor alloys. HEA-NPs possess a wide range of compositional library, distinct alloy mixing structure, and nanoscale size effect, giving them huge potential in catalysis, energy, environmental, and biomedical applications.

== Enabling synthesis ==
HEA-NPs are a structural analog to bulk high-entropy alloys (HEAs), but synthesized at the nanoscale. The formation of HEAs typically requires high temperature for multi-element mixing; however, high temperature acts against nano-material synthesis due to high-temperature-induced structure aggregation and surface reconstruction.

In 2018, HEA-NPs were firstly synthesized by a carbothermal shock synthesis. (The material and technology are patented.) The carbothermal shock employs a rapid high-temperature heating (e.g. 2000 K, in 55 ms) to enable the non-equilibrium synthesis of HEA-NPs with uniform size and homogeneous mixing despite containing immiscible combinations. Although rapid quenching is desired to maintain the solid-solution state, too fast cooling rate can hinder structural ordering. Therefore, the cooling rate should be chosen carefully based on the temperature-time-transformation diagram.

Another guide that can be used for the synthesis is the Ellingham diagram. Elements at the top of the diagram are easily reduced and tend to form HEA-NPs, while elements at the bottom of the diagram tend to form high-entropy oxide NPs.

Later, other similar non-equilibrium "shock" methods were also introduced to synthesize HEA-NPs and other types of high entropy nanostructures. Recently, a low temperature synthesis through simultaneous multi-cation exchange (below 900 K) has been demonstrated for high-entropy metal sulfide NPs, which may be applied to metal selenides, tellurides, phosphides, and halides as well.

In 2024 a study showed that induction plasma can be used as a one-step method that enables the continuous synthesis of HEA-NPs directly from elemental metal powders via in-flight alloying.

== Structural analysis ==
Due to the random distribution of elements in HEA-NPs, in addition to conventional characterization methods, other methods with higher resolution are needed for their structural analysis. To analyze the random mixing of multiple elements, atomic electron tomography can be used, which provides positional precision of 21 pm and identification of atoms by periods. Furthermore, X-ray absorption spectroscopy can give information on local coordination environments, while extended X-ray absorption fine structure can be used to get coordination numbers and bond distances. Combined with hard X-ray photoelectron spectroscopy or X-ray absorption near-edge structure, these analyses can be used to explore structure–property relationships in HEA-NPs. In addition, due to the immense number of possibilities of compositions and surfaces (i.e., terrace, edge, and corner) available for HEA-NPs, simulations such as density functional theory calculations are also popularly used for their analysis.

Surface morphology, particle size, and particle shape can be characterized using various microscopy techniques, such as scanning electron microscopy (SEM) with secondary electron detectors and transmission electron microscopy (TEM). Scanning transmission electron microscopy (STEM) combined with energy-dispersive X-ray spectroscopy (EDS) can be used for nanoscale elemental and compositional analysis of high-entropy alloy nanoparticles.

== Properties and applications ==
HEA-NPs have a large compositional library, which enables tunability in chemical composition, structure, and associated properties. In HEA-NPs, the same type of atoms can have different local density of states because their neighboring atom compositions can be different. Such variations in local environment lead to diverse and tunable adsorption energy levels, which can be beneficial to satisfy the Sabatier principle especially for complex reactions.

In addition, owing to the high entropy structure, HEA-NPs typically show improved structural stability. One suggested mechanism for the enhanced structural stability is through prevention of phase separation due to lattice distortions from different sized elements acting as diffusion barriers. With the above merits, HEA-NPs have been used as high-performance catalysts for both thermochemical and electrochemical reactions, such as ammonia oxidation, decomposition, and water splitting. High throughput and data mining approaches are being implemented toward accelerated materials discovery in the multi-dimensional space of HEA-NPs.

== See also ==
- High-entropy alloys
- Thermal shock synthesis
- Self-assembly of nanoparticles
