= High-entropy alloy =

Alloys with high proportions of several metals

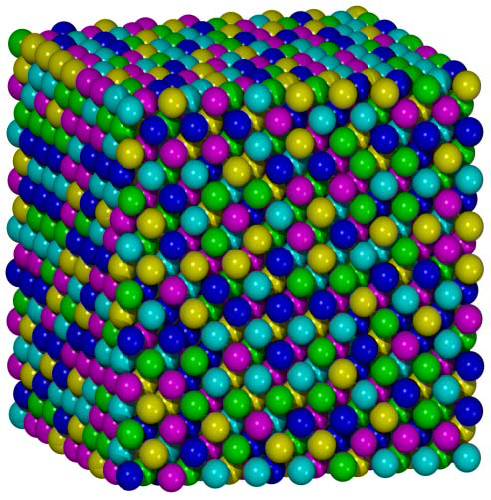
Atomic structure model of fcc CoCrFeMnNi

High-entropy alloys (HEAs) are alloys that are formed by mixing equal or relatively large proportions of (usually) five or more elements. Prior to the synthesis of these substances, typical metal alloys comprised one or two major components with smaller amounts of other elements. For example, additional elements can be added to iron to improve its properties, thereby creating an iron-based alloy, but typically in fairly low proportions, such as the proportions of carbon, manganese, and others in various steels. Hence, high-entropy alloys are a novel class of materials.

The term "high-entropy alloys" was coined by Taiwanese scientist Jien-Wei Yeh because the entropy increase of mixing is substantially higher when there is a larger number of elements in the mix, and their proportions are more nearly equal. Some alternative names, such as multi-component alloys, compositionally complex alloys and multi-principal-element alloys are also suggested by other researchers. Compositionally complex alloys (CCAs) are an up-and-coming group of materials due to their unique mechanical properties. They have high strength and toughness, the ability to operate at higher temperatures than current alloys, and have superior ductility. Ductility quantifies the permanent deformation a material can withstand before failure, a key consideration in designing safe and reliable materials. Due to their enhanced properties, CCAs show promise in extreme environments. An extreme environment presents significant challenges for a material to perform to its intended use within designated safety limits. CCAs can be used in several applications such as aerospace propulsion systems, land-based gas turbines, heat exchangers, and the chemical process industry.

These alloys are currently the focus of significant attention in materials science and engineering because they have potentially desirable properties. Furthermore, research indicates that some HEAs have considerably better strength-to-weight ratios, with a higher degree of fracture resistance, tensile strength, and corrosion and oxidation resistance than conventional alloys. Although HEAs have been studied since the 1980s, research substantially accelerated in the 2010s.

== Development ==
Early research in high entropy alloys began in the late 1970s and early 1980s by Brian Cantor. Previously recognized as multi-principal element alloys, the earliest works included research on rapidly solidified AI-Cu-Li-Mg-Zr alloys and oxidation behavior of Co_{58}Ni_{10}Fe_{5}Si_{11}B_{16}. The base alloy he developed, equiatomic CrMnFeCoNi, has been the subject of considerable work in the field, and is known as the "Cantor alloy", with similar derivatives known as Cantor alloys. It was one of the first HEAs to be reported to form a single-phase FCC (face-centred cubic crystal structure) solid solution. Today, potential applications include use in state-of-the-art race cars, spacecraft, submarines, nuclear reactors, jet aircraft, nuclear weapons, long range hypersonic missiles, and so on.

Two foundational works were produced in 2004 and 2005 that defined the classification of high entropy alloys. One was produced by Brian Cantor, "Microstructural development in equiatomic multicomponent alloys", and "Nanostructured High-Entropy Alloys with Multiple Principal Elements: Novel Alloy Design Concepts and Outcomes" by Taiwanese scientist Jien-Wei Yeh. The term, 'high entropy alloy', was coined by Jien-Wei Yeh in 2004 as his first work concluded high configurational entropy was the mechanism stabilizing the solid solution phase.

Before the classification of high-entropy alloys and multi-component systems as a separate class of materials, nuclear scientists had already studied a system that can now be classified as a high-entropy alloy: within nuclear fuels Mo-Pd-Rh-Ru-Tc particles form at grain boundaries and at fission gas bubbles. Understanding the behavior of these "five-metal particles" was of specific interest to the medical industry because Tc-99m is an important medical imaging isotope.

== Definition ==
There is no universally agreed-upon definition of a HEA. The originally defined HEAs as alloys containing at least 5 elements with concentrations between 5 and 35 atomic percent. Later research, however, suggested that this definition could be expanded. Otto et al. suggested that only alloys that form a solid solution with no intermetallic phases should be considered true high-entropy alloys, because the formation of ordered phases decreases the entropy of the system. Some authors have described four-component alloys as high-entropy alloys while others have suggested that alloys meeting the other requirements of HEAs, but with only 2–4 elements or a mixing entropy between R and 1.5R should be considered "medium-entropy" alloys.

== The four core effects of HEAs ==
Due to their multi-component composition, HEAs exhibit different basic effects than other traditional alloys that are based only on one or two elements. Those different effects are called "the four core effects of HEAs" and are behind a lot of the particular microstructure and properties of HEAs. The four core effects are high entropy, severe lattice distortion, sluggish diffusion, and cocktail effects.

=== High entropy effect ===
The high entropy effect is the most important effect because it can enhance the formation of solid solutions and makes the microstructure much simpler than expected. Prior knowledge expected multi component alloys to have many different interactions among elements and thus form many different kinds of binary, ternary, and quaternary compounds and/or segregated phases. Thus, such alloys would possess complicated structures, brittle by nature. This expectation in fact neglects the effect of high entropy. Indeed, according to the second law of thermodynamics, the state having the lowest mixing Gibbs free energy $\Delta G_{mix} = \Delta H_{mix} - T\Delta S_{mix}$ among all possible states would be the equilibrium state. Elemental phases based on one major element have small enthalpy of mixing ($\Delta H_{mix}$) and a small entropy of mixing ($\Delta S_{mix}$), and compound phases have large $\Delta H_{mix}$ but small $\Delta S_{mix}$; on the other hand, solid-solution phases containing multiple elements have medium $\Delta H_{mix}$ and high $\Delta S_{mix}$. As a result, solid-solution phases become highly competitive for equilibrium state and more stable especially at high temperatures. However, recent experimental and theory work have revealed the flaw of this framework. The stability of the solid-solution phase should be considered by the change in the Gibbs free energy if a small amount of a new compound phase form from the solid-solution phase. If the formation of the new compound phase can decrease the Gibbs free energy, the solid solution phase is not stable (marginal utility). Compared with the high entropy effect, this new paradigm considers the multiphase microstructure and explains the experimental observation that the single phase high-entropy alloys are actually rare.

=== Severe lattice distortion effect ===
Schematic diagram showing large lattice distortion existing in the five component BCC lattice

Because solid solution phases with multi-principal elements are usually found in HEAs, the conventional crystal structure concept is thus extended from a one or two element basis to a multi-element basis. Every atom is surrounded by different kinds of atoms and thus suffers lattice strain and stress mainly due to atomic size difference. Besides the atomic size difference, both different bonding energy and crystal structure tendency among constituent elements are also believed to cause even higher lattice distortion because non-symmetrical bindings and electronic structure exist between an atom and its first neighbours. This distortion is believed to be the source of some of the mechanical, thermal, electrical, optical, and chemical behaviour of HEAs. Thus, overall lattice distortion would be more severe than that in traditional alloys in which most matrix atoms (or solvent atoms) have the same kind of atoms as their surroundings.

=== Sluggish diffusion effect ===
As explained in the last section, an HEA mainly contains a random solid solution and/or an ordered solid solution. Their matrices could be regarded as whole-solute matrices. In HEAs, those whole-solute matrices' diffusion vacancies are surrounded by different element atoms, and thus have a specific lattice potential energy (LPE). This large fluctuation of LPE between lattice sites leads to low-LPE sites, serving as traps and hindering atomic diffusion. This leads to the sluggish diffusion effect.

=== Cocktail effect ===
The cocktail effect is used to emphasise the enhancement of the alloy's properties by at least five major elements. Because HEAs might have one or more phases, the whole properties are from the overall contribution of the constituent phases. Besides, each phase is a solid solution and can be viewed as a composite with properties coming not only from the basic properties of the constituent, but by the mixture rule also from the interactions among all the constituents and from severe lattice distortion. The cocktail effect takes into account the effect from the atomic-scale multicomponent phases and from the multiple composite phases at the micro scale.

== Alloy design ==
In conventional alloy design, one primary element such as iron, copper, or aluminum is chosen for its properties. Then, small amounts of additional elements are added to improve or add properties. Even among binary alloy systems, there are few common cases of both elements being used in nearly-equal proportions such as Pb-Sn solders. Therefore, much is known from experimental results about phases near the edges of binary phase diagrams and the corners of ternary phase diagrams and much less is known about phases near the centers. In higher-order (4+ components) systems that cannot be easily represented on a two-dimensional phase diagram, virtually nothing is known.

Early research of HEA was focussed on forming single-phased solid solution, which could maximize the major features of high entropy alloy: high entropy, sluggish diffusion, severe lattice distortion, and cocktail effects. It has been pointed out that most successful materials need some secondary phase to strengthen the material, and that any HEA used in application will have a multiphase microstructure. However, it is still important to form single-phased material since a single-phased sample is essential for understanding the underlying mechanism of HEAs and testing specific microstructures to find structures producing special properties.

=== Phase formation ===
Gibbs' phase rule, $F=C-P+2$, can be used to determine an upper bound on the number of phases that will form in an equilibrium system. In his 2004 paper, Cantor created a 20-component alloy containing 5% of Mn, Cr, Fe, Co, Ni, Cu, Ag, W, Mo, Nb, Al, Cd, Sn, Pb, Bi, Zn, Ge, Si, Sb, and Mg. At constant pressure, the phase rule would allow for up to 21 phases at equilibrium, but far fewer actually formed. The predominant phase was a face-centered cubic solid-solution phase, containing mainly Cr, Mn, Fe, Co, and Ni. From that result, the CrMnFeCoNi alloy, which forms only a solid-solution phase, was developed.

The much lower number of phases than the upper bound have also been widely observed in other high-entropy alloys, and it has been attributed to a high-entropy effect. Assuming the high-entropy decreases the driving force for the formation of all new phases from the solid solution, the ratio of the strongest driving force to the second strongest driving force would increase, and therefore the formation of the new phase with the second strongest driving force would be inhibited.

The Hume-Rothery rules have historically been applied to determine whether a mixture will form a solid solution. Research into high-entropy alloys has found that in multi-component systems, these rules tend to be relaxed slightly. In particular, the rule that solvent and solute elements must have the same crystal structure does not seem to apply, as Cr, Mn, Fe, Co, and Ni have four different crystal structures as pure elements (and when the elements are present in equal concentrations, there can be no meaningful distinction between "solvent" and "solute" elements).

=== Thermodynamic mechanisms ===
Phase formation of HEA is determined by thermodynamics and geometry. When phase formation is controlled by thermodynamics and kinetics are ignored, the Gibbs free energy of mixing $\Delta G_{mix}$ is defined as:

$$\Delta G_{mix} = \Delta H_{mix} - T\Delta S_{mix}$$

where $H_{mix}$ is defined as enthalpy of mixing, $T$ is temperature, and $\Delta S_{mix}$ is entropy of mixing respectively. $\Delta H_{mix}$ and $T \Delta S_{mix}$ continuously compete to determine the phase of the HEA material. Other important factors include the atomic size of each element within the HEA, where Hume-Rothery rules and Akihisa Inoue's's three empirical rules for bulk metallic glass play a role.

Disordered solids form when atomic size difference is small and $\Delta G_{mix}$ is not negative enough. This is because every atom is about the same size and can easily substitute for each other and $\Delta H_{mix}$ is not low enough to form a compound. More-ordered HEAs form as the size difference between the elements gets larger and $\Delta G_{mix}$ gets more negative. When the size difference of each individual element become too large, bulk metallic glasses form instead of HEAs. High temperature and high $\Delta S_{mix}$ also promote the formation of HEA because they significantly lower $\Delta G_{mix}$, making the HEA easier to form because it is more stable than other phases such as intermetallics.

The multi-component alloys that Yeh developed also consisted mostly or entirely of solid-solution phases, contrary to what had been expected from earlier work in multi-component systems, primarily in the field of metallic glasses. Yeh attributed this result to the high configurational, or mixing, entropy of a random solid solution containing numerous elements. The mixing entropy for a random ideal solid solution can be calculated by:

$${\Delta}S_{mix}=-R\sum_{i=1}^N c_i \ln{c_i}$$

where $R$ is the ideal gas constant, $N$ is the number of components, and $c_i$ is the atomic fraction of component $i$. From this it can be seen that alloys in which the components are present in equal proportions will have the highest entropy, and adding additional elements will increase the entropy. A five-component, equiatomic alloy will have a mixing entropy of 1.61R.

Empirical parameters and design guidelines for forming solid solution HEAs
Parameter	Design guideline
∆S_{mix}	Maximized
∆H_{mix}	> -10 and < 5 kJ/mol
Ω	≥ 1.1
δ	≤ 6.6%
VEC	≥ 8 for fcc, <6.87 for bcc

However, entropy alone is not sufficient to stabilize the solid-solution phase in every system. The enthalpy of mixing (ΔH) must also be taken into account. This can be calculated using:

$${\Delta}H_{mix}=\sum_{i=1,i{\ne}j}^N 4{\Delta}H^{mix}_{AB}c_i c_j$$

where ${\Delta}H^{mix}_{AB}$ is the binary enthalpy of mixing for A and B. Zhang et al. found, empirically, that in order to form a complete solid solution, ΔH_{mix} should be between -10 and 5 kJ/mol. In addition, Otto et al. found that if the alloy contains any pair of elements that tend to form ordered compounds in their binary system, a multi-component alloy containing them is also likely to form ordered compounds.

Both of the thermodynamic parameters can be combined into a single, unitless parameter Ω:

$$\Omega=\frac{T_m {\Delta}S_{mix}}{\left\vert{\Delta}H_{mix}\right\vert}$$

where T_{m} is the average melting point of the elements in the alloy. Ω should be greater than or equal to 1.0, (or 1.1 in practice), which means entropy dominates over enthalpy at the point of solidification, to promote solid solution development.

Ω can be optimized by adjusting element composition. Waite J. C. has proposed an optimisation algorithm to maximize Ω and demonstrated that slight change in composition could cause huge increase of Ω.

=== Kinetic mechanisms ===
The atomic radii of the components must also be similar in order to form a solid solution. Zhang et al. proposed a parameter δ, average lattice mismatch, representing the difference in atomic radii:

$$\delta=\sqrt{\sum_{i=1}^N c_i \left( 1-\frac{r_i}{\bar{r}} \right)^2}$$

where r_{i} is the atomic radius of element i and $\bar{r}=\sum_{i=1}^N c_i r_i$. Formation of a solid-solution phase requires a δ ≤ 6.6%, which is an empirical number based on experiments on bulk metallic glasses (BMG). Exceptions are found on both sides of 6.6%: some alloys with 4% < δ ≤ 6.6% do form intermetallics, and solid-solution phases do appear in alloys with δ > 9%.

The multi-element lattice in HEAs is highly distorted because all elements are solute atoms and their atomic radii are different. δ helps evaluating the lattice strain caused by disorder crystal structure. When the atomic size difference (δ) is sufficiently large, the distorted lattice would collapse and a new phase such as an amorphous structure would be formed. The lattice distortion effect can result in solid solution hardening.

== Deformation and strengthening mechanisms ==
High-entropy alloys (HEAs) differ from conventional alloys in both their deformation behavior and strengthening mechanisms, owing to the absence of a dominant solvent element and the resulting chemical and structural complexity.

In terms of deformation, dislocation slip is the primary mode of plasticity. In FCC HEAs such as the CrMnFeCoNi Cantor alloy, slip often occurs on {111} planes and produces long pile-ups, while cross-slip is relatively difficult. At cryogenic temperatures, deformation twinning is activated, which greatly enhances work-hardening and ductility. In contrast, BCC refractory HEAs are controlled by sluggish screw dislocations with small activation volumes, resulting in strong temperature dependence of yield stress. These contrasting behaviors explain why some HEAs maintain high toughness even at cryogenic conditions while others show unusual strength–temperature responses.

Schematic diagram of TWIP and TRIP strengthening mechanism

Strengthening in HEAs arises from several sources. Solid solution strengthening is particularly strong because near-equiatomic compositions generate significant lattice distortion that impedes dislocation motion. The stacking-fault energy (SFE) is another key factor: high-SFE alloys deform mainly by slip, whereas low-SFE alloys can activate twinning (TWIP) or martensitic transformation (TRIP), both of which improve strength–ductility combinations. Interstitial elements such as carbon, nitrogen, and oxygen provide further control; for example, small oxygen additions in refractory HEAs can pin dislocations and promote cross-slip, simultaneously enhancing strength and ductility. In metastable systems with very low SFE, cyclic FCC↔HCP transformations produce nanoscale twins and lamellae through bidirectional TRIP (B-TRIP), raising interface density and strengthening the alloy without sacrificing ductility. In BCC HEAs, TRIP has been demonstrated in the off-equiatomic alloy Ti_{35}Zr_{27.5}Hf_{27.5}Nb_{5}Ta_{5}. This alloy undergoes a stress-induced transformation from the BCC phase to orthorhombic α′′ martensite during deformation, showing a lower yield strength but roughly double the ductility with similar ultimate tensile strength compared to that of the equiatomic alloy.

Although these mechanisms provide exceptional property combinations, open questions remain. The influence of local short-range chemical ordering, the thermal stability of single-phase solid solutions, and the effects of segregation and interstitials on embrittlement and fatigue are still under investigation. Combining experiments with CALPHAD modeling and ab initio simulations is seen as a promising route to systematically design HEAs that exploit these deformation and strengthening mechanisms.

=== Other properties ===
For those alloys that do form solid solutions, an additional empirical parameter has been proposed to predict the crystal structure that will form. HEAs are usually FCC (face-centred cubic), BCC (body-centred cubic), HCP (hexagonal close-packed), or a mixture of the above structures, and each structure has their own advantages and disadvantages in terms of mechanical properties. There are many methods to predict the structure of HEA. Valence electron concentration (VEC) can be used to predict the stability of the HEA structure. The stability of physical properties of the HEA is closely associated with electron concentration (this is associated with the electron concentration rule from the Hume-Rothery rules).

When HEA is made with casting, only FCC structures are formed when VEC is larger than 8. When VEC is between 6.87 and 8, HEA is a mixture of BCC and FCC, and while VEC is below 6.87, the material is BCC. In order to produce a certain crystal structure of HEA, certain phase stabilizing elements can be added. Experimentally, adding elements such as Al and Cr can help the formation of BCC HEA while Ni and Co can help form FCC HEA.

== Synthesis ==
High-entropy alloys are difficult to manufacture using existing techniques as of 2018, and typically require both expensive materials and specialty processing techniques.

High-entropy alloys are mostly produced using methods that depend on the metals phase – if the metals are combined while in a liquid, solid, or gas state.

- Most HEAs have been produced using liquid-phase methods include arc melting, induction melting, and Bridgman solidification.
- Solid-state processing is generally done by mechanical alloying using a high-energy ball mill. This method produces powders that can then be processed using conventional powder metallurgy methods or spark plasma sintering. This method allows for alloys to be produced that would be difficult or impossible to produce using casting, such as LiMgAlScTi. These powders have usually an irregular shape and can be transformed into spherical shape via powder spheroidization for the use in various additive manufacturing processes.
- The conventional method of mechanical alloying mixes all required elements in one step, where elements A, B, C, and D get milled together to form ABCD directly. Vaidya et al. proposed a new method of creating HEA with mechanical alloying called sequential alloying, where elements are added step by step. In order to create AlCrFeCoNi HEA, Vaidya's team first formed binary CoNi alloy, then added Fe to form tertiary FeCoNi, Cr to form CrFeCoNi, and Al to from AlCrFeCoNi. The same alloy composition can be produced through different sequences, and different sequences lead to different proportions of BCC and FCC phases, showing a path dependence on the method. For example, one sequence of AlCrFeCoNi milling for 70 hours in total produces an alloy with 100% BCC phase, while another produces an alloy with 80% BCC phase.
- Gas-phase processing includes processes such as sputtering or molecular beam epitaxy (MBE), which can be used to carefully control different elemental compositions to get high-entropy metallic or ceramic films.

Additive manufacturing can produce alloys with a different microstructure, potentially increasing strength (to 1.3 gigapascals) as well as increasing ductility.

Other techniques include thermal spray, laser cladding, and electrodeposition.

== Modeling and simulation ==
The atomic-scale complexity presents additional challenges to computational modelling of high-entropy alloys. Thermodynamic modeling using the CALPHAD method requires extrapolating from binary and ternary systems. Most commercial thermodynamic databases are designed for, and may only be valid for, alloys consisting primarily of a single element. Thus, they require experimental verification or additional ab initio calculations such as density functional theory (DFT). However, DFT modeling of complex, random alloys has its own challenges, as the method requires defining a fixed-size cell, which can introduce non-random periodicity. This is commonly overcome using the method of "special quasirandom structures", designed to most closely approximate the radial distribution function of a random system, combined with the Vienna Ab initio Simulation Package. Using this method, it has been shown that results of a four-component equiatomic alloy begins to converge with a cell as small as 24 atoms. The exact muffin-tin orbital method with the coherent potential approximation (CPA) has also been employed to model HEAs.

Another approach based on the KKR-CPA formulation of DFT is the $S^{(2)}$ theory for multicomponent alloys, which evaluates the two-point correlation function, an atomic short-range order parameter, ab initio. The $S^{(2)}$ theory has been used with success to study the Cantor alloy, CrMnFeCoNi, and its derivatives, the refractory HEAs, Al-containing HEAs, as well as to examine the influence of an alloy's magnetic state on atomic ordering tendencies.

Other techniques include the 'multiple randomly populated supercell' approach, which better describes the random population of a true solid solution (although this is far more computationally demanding). This method has also been used to model glassy and amorphous systems without a crystal lattice (including bulk metallic glasses).

Further, modeling techniques are being used to suggest new HEAs for targeted applications. The use of modeling techniques in this 'combinatorial explosion' is necessary for targeted and rapid HEA discovery and application.

Simulations have highlighted the preference for local ordering in some high-entropy alloys and, when the enthalpies of formation are combined with terms for configurational entropy, transition temperatures between order and disorder can be estimated, allowing one to understand when effects like age hardening and degradation of an alloy's mechanical properties may be an issue.

The transition temperature to reach the solid solution (miscibility gap) was recently addressed with the Lederer-Toher-Vecchio-Curtarolo thermodynamic model.

== Phase diagram generation ==
CALPHAD (CALculation of PHAse Diagrams) is a method to create reliable thermodynamic databases that can be an effective tool when searching for single phase HEAs. However, this method can be limited since it needs to extrapolate from known binary or ternary phase diagrams. This method also does not take into account the process of material synthesis and can only predict equilibrium phases. The phase diagrams of HEAs can be explored experimentally via high throughput experimentation (HTE). This method rapidly produces hundreds of samples, allowing the researcher to explore a region of composition in one step and thus can used to quickly map out the phase diagram of the HEA. Another way to predict the phase of the HEA is via enthalpy concentration. This method accounts for specific combinations of single phase HEA and rejects similar combinations that have been shown not to be single phase. This model uses first principle high throughput density functional theory to calculate the enthalpies, thus requiring no experiment input, and it has shown excellent agreement with reported experimental results.

== Properties and potential uses ==
=== Mechanical ===
The crystal structure of HEAs has been found to be the dominant factor in determining the mechanical properties. BCC HEAs typically have high yield strength and low ductility and vice versa for FCC HEAs. Some alloys have been particularly noted for their exceptional mechanical properties. A refractory alloy, VNbMoTaW maintains a high yield strength (>600 MPa (87 ksi)) even at a temperature of 1,400 °C (2,550 °F), significantly outperforming conventional superalloys such as Inconel 718. However, room temperature ductility is poor, less is known about other important high temperature properties such as creep resistance, and the density of the alloy is higher than conventional nickel-based superalloys.

CrMnFeCoNi has been found to have exceptional low-temperature mechanical properties and high fracture toughness, with both ductility and yield strength increasing as the test temperature was reduced from room temperature to 77 K (−321.1 °F). This was attributed to the onset of nanoscale twin boundary formation, an additional deformation mechanism that was not in effect at higher temperatures. At ultralow temperatures, inhomogenous deformation by serrations has been reported. As such, it may have applications as a structural material in low-temperature applications or, because of its high toughness, as an energy-absorbing material. However, later research showed that lower-entropy alloys with fewer elements or non-equiatomic compositions may have higher strength or higher toughness. No ductile to brittle transition was observed in the BCC AlCrFeCoNi alloy in tests as low as 77 K.

Al_{0.5}CrFeCoNiCu was found to have a high fatigue life and endurance limit, possibly exceeding some conventional steel and titanium alloys, but there was significant variability in the results. This suggests the material is very sensitive to defects introduced during manufacturing such as aluminum oxide particles and microcracks.

A single-phase nanocrystalline Al_{20}Li_{20}Mg_{10}Sc_{20}Ti_{30} alloy was developed with a density of 2.67 g cm^{−3} and microhardness of 4.9–5.8 GPa, which would give it an estimated strength-to-weight ratio comparable to ceramic materials such as silicon carbide, though the high cost of scandium limits the possible uses.

Rather than bulk HEAs, small-scale HEA samples (e.g., NbMoTaW micro-pillars) exhibit extraordinarily high yield strengths of 4–10 GPa — one order of magnitude higher than that of its bulk form – and their ductility is considerably improved. Additionally, such HEA films show substantially enhanced stability for high-temperature, long-duration conditions (at 1,100 °C for 3 days). Small-scale HEAs combining these properties represent a new class of materials in small-dimension devices potentially for high-stress and high-temperature applications.

In 2018, new types of HEAs based on the careful placement of ordered oxygen complexes, a type of ordered interstitial complex, have been produced. In particular, alloys of titanium, hafnium, and zirconium have been shown to have enhanced work hardening and ductility characteristics.

Bala et al. studied the effects of high-temperature exposure on the microstructure and mechanical properties of the Al_{5}Ti_{5}Co_{35}Ni_{35}Fe_{20} high-entropy alloy. After hot rolling and air-quenching, the alloy was exposed to a temperature range of 650–900 °C for 7 days. The air-quenching caused γ′ precipitation distributed uniformly throughout the microstructure. The high-temperature exposure resulted in growth of the γ′ particles and at temperatures higher than 700 °C, additional precipitation of γ′ was observed. The highest mechanical properties were obtained after exposure to 650 °C with a yield strength of 1050 MPa and an ultimate tensile yield strength of 1370 MPa. Increasing the temperature further decreased the mechanical properties.

Liu et al. studied a series of quaternary non-equimolar high-entropy alloys Al_{x}Cr_{15x}Co_{15x}Ni_{70−x} with x ranging from 0 to 35%. The lattice structure transitioned from FCC to BCC as Al content increased and with Al content in the range of 12.5 to 19.3 at%, the γ′ phase formed and strengthened the alloy at both room and elevated temperatures. With Al content at 19.3 at%, a lamellar eutectic structure formed composed of γ′ and B2 phases. Due to high γ′ phase fraction of 70 vol%, the alloy had a compressive yield strength of 925 MPa and fracture strain of 29% at room temperature and high yield strength at high temperatures as well with values of 789, 546, and 129 MPa at the temperatures of 973, 1123, and 1273 K.

In general, refractory high-entropy alloys have exceptional strength at elevated temperatures but are brittle at room temperature. The TiZrNbHfTa alloy is an exception, with plasticity of over 50% at room temperature. However, its strength at high temperature is insufficient. With the aim of increasing high temperature strength, Chien-Chuang et al. modified the composition of TiZrNbHfTa and studied the mechanical properties of the refractory high-entropy alloys TiZrMoHfTa and TiZrNbMoHfTa. Both alloys have simple BCC structure. Their experiments showed that the yield strength of TiZrNbMoHfTa had a yield strength 6 times greater than TiZrMoHfTa at 1200 °C with a fracture strain of 12% retained in the alloy at room temperature.

The use of precipitant strengthening in multi-phase HEAs could provide the higher strength, thermal stability and oxidation resistance required for high temperature applications. For example, using computational methods CoCrFeNiAlTi with up to 20% aluminum and titanium will precipitate γ' precipitates such as Ni3Al, but keeping the Al/Ti ratio within 0.8-3 will prevent brittle precipitants such as NiAl, Ni2AlTi, or Ni3Ti from forming. Along similar lines balancing Fe, Cr, and Co compositions can prevent the specific, brittle σ phase (which is a type of Frank-Kasper/TCP phase) from forming.

=== Electrical and magnetic ===
CrFeCoNiCu is an FCC alloy that was found to be paramagnetic. But upon adding titanium, it forms a complex microstructure consisting of FCC solid solution, amorphous regions and nanoparticles of Laves phase, resulting in superparamagnetic behavior. High magnetic coercivity has been measured in a FeMnNiCoBi alloy. There are several magnetic high-entropy alloys which exhibit promising soft magnetic behavior with strong mechanical properties. Superconductivity was observed in TiZrNbHfTa alloys, with transition temperatures between 5.0 and 7.3 K.

High-entropy alloys are promising for electronics due to their thermal stability and electrical conductivity. They are being used for high-performance applications like power electronics, heat spreaders, sensors, and inductors, and show potential for efficient conductive materials in advanced components.

=== Thermal stability ===
Since high-entropy alloys are likely utilized in high temperature environments, thermal stability is very important for designing HEA. Nano-crystallinity is especially critical where extra driving force exists for grain growth. Two aspects need to be considered for nano-crystalline HEAs: the stability of phases formed, which is dominated by the thermodynamics mechanism (see alloy design), and the retention of nanocrystallinity. The stability of nano-crystalline HEAs are controlled by many factors, including grain boundary diffusion, presence of oxide, etc.

=== Other ===
The high concentrations of multiple elements leads to slow diffusion. The activation energy for diffusion was found to be higher for several elements in CrMnFeCoNi than in pure metals and stainless steels, leading to lower diffusion coefficients.

Some equiatomic multicomponent alloys have also been reported to show good resistance to damage by energetic radiation.

High-entropy alloys are being investigated for hydrogen storage applications. Some high-entropy alloys such as TiZrCrMnFeNi show fast and reversible hydrogen storage at room temperature with good storage capacity for commercial applications. The high-entropy materials have high potential for a wider range of energy applications, particularly in the form of high-entropy ceramics.

The development of high-entropy photocatalysts, which was initiated in 2020, is one of the applications which has been employed for hydrogen production, oxygen production, carbon dioxide conversion and plastic waste conversion.

A number of tungsten-based HEAs exhibit self-sharpening, making them possible candidate materials for kinetic energy penetrators and other penetration workloads. Examples include equimolar WMoFeNi and W30Mo7FeNi (W30-Mo7-Fe31.5-Ni31.5, in atomic %). The reason for self-sharpening is that the ultra-strong μ phase induces a high local strain gradient, which generates adiabatic shear bands.

== High-entropy alloy films (HEAFs) ==
=== Introduction ===
Most HEAs are prepared by vacuum arc melting, which obtains larger grain sizes at the μm-level. As a result, studies regarding high-performance high entropy alloy films (HEAFs) have attracted more material scientists. Compared to the preparation methods of HEA bulk materials, HEAFs are easily achieved by rapid solidification with a faster cooling rate of 10^{9} K/s. A rapid cooling rate can limit the diffusion of the constituent elements, inhibit phase separation, favor the formation of the single solid-solution phase or even an amorphous structure, and obtain a smaller grain size (nm) than those of HEA bulk materials (μm). So far, lots of technologies have been used to fabricate the HEAFs such as spraying, laser cladding, electrodeposition, and magnetron sputtering. Magnetron sputtering technique is the most-used method to fabricate the HEAFs. An inert gas (Ar) is introduced in a vacuum chamber and it's accelerated by a high voltage that is applied between the substrate and the target. As a result, a target is bombarded by the energetic ions and some atoms are ejected from the target surface, then these atoms reach the substrate and condense on the substrate to form a thin film. The composition of each constituent element in HEAFs can be controlled by a given target and the operational parameters like power, gas flow, bias, and working distance between substrate and target during film deposition. Also, the oxide, nitride, and carbide films can be readily prepared by introducing reactive gases such as O_{2}, N_{2}, and C_{2}H_{2}. Until now, three routes have been investigated to prepare HEAFs via the magnetron sputtering technique. First, a single HEA target can be used to fabricate the HEAFs. The related contents of the as-deposited films are approximately equal to that of the original target alloy even though each element has a different sputtering yield with the help of the pre-sputtering step. However, preparing a single HEA target is very time-consuming and difficult. For example, it's hard to produce an equiatomic CoCrFeMnNi alloy target due to the high evaporation rate of Mn. Thus, the additional amount of Mn is hard to expect and calculate to ensure each element is equiatomic. Secondly, HEAFs can be synthesized by co-sputtering deposition with various metal targets. A wide range of chemical compositions can be controlled by varying the processing conditions such as power, bias, gas flow, etc. Based on the published papers, lots of researchers doped different quantities of elements such as Al, Mo, V, Nb, Ti, and Nd into the CrMnFeCoNi system, which can modify the chemical composition and structure of the alloy and improve the mechanical properties. These HEAFs were prepared by co-sputtering deposition with a single CrMnFeCoNi alloy and Al/Ti/V/Mo/Nb targets. However, it needs trial and error to obtain the desired composition. Take Al_{x}CrMnFeCoNi films as an example. The crystalline structure changed from the single FCC phase for x = 0.07 to duplex FCC + BCC phases for x = 0.3, and eventually, to a single BCC phase for x = 1.0. The whole process was manipulated by varying both powers of CoCrFeMnNi and Al targets to obtain desired compositions, showing a phase transition from FCC to BCC phase with increasing Al contents. The last one is via the powder targets. The compositions of the target are simply adjusted by altering the weight fractions of the individual powders, but these powders must be well-mixed to ensure homogeneity. AlCrFeCoNiCu films were successfully deposited by sputtering pressed power targets.

Recently, there are more researchers investigating the mechanical properties of the HEAFs with nitrogen incorporation due to superior properties like high hardness. As above-mentioned, nitride-based HEAFs can be synthesized via magnetron sputtering by incorporating N_{2} and Ar gases into the vacuum chamber. Adjusting the nitrogen flow ratio, R_{N} = N_{2}/(Ar + N_{2}), can obtain different amounts of nitrogen. Most of them increased the nitrogen flow ratio to study the correlation between phase transformation and mechanical properties.

=== Hardness and related modulus values ===
Both values of hardness and related moduli like reduced modulus (Er) or elastic modulus (E) will significantly increase through the magnetron sputtering method. This is because the rapid cooling rate can limit the growth of grain size, i.e., HEAFs have smaller grain sizes compared to bulk counterparts, which can inhibit the motion of dislocation and then lead to an increase in mechanical properties such as hardness and elastic modulus. For instance, CoCrFeMnNiAl_{x} films were successfully prepared by the co-sputtering method. The as-deposited CoCrFeMnNi film (Al_{0}) exhibited a single FCC structure with a lower hardness of around 5.71 GPa, and the addition of a small amount of Al atoms resulted in an increase to 5.91 GPa in the FCC structure of Al_{0.07}. With the further addition of Al, the hardness increased drastically to 8.36 GPa in the duplex FCC + BCC phases region. When the phase transformed to a single BCC structure, the Al_{1.3} film reached a maximum hardness of 8.74 GPa. As a result, the structural transition from FCC to BCC led to hardness enhancements with the increasing Al content. It is worth noting that Al-doped CoCrFeMnNi HEAs have been processed and their mechanical properties have been characterized by Xian et al. and the measured hardness values are included in Hsu et al. work for comparison. Compared to Al-doped CoCrFeMnNi HEAs, Al-doped CoCrFeMnNi HEAFs had a much higher hardness, which could be attributed to the much smaller size of HEAFs (nm vs. μm). Also, the reduced modulus in Al_{0} and Al_{1.3} are 172.84 and 167.19 GPa, respectively.

In addition, the RF-sputtering technique was capable of depositing CoCrFeMnNiTi_{x} HEAFs by co-sputtering of CoCrFeMnNi alloy and Ti targets. The hardness increased drastically to 8.61 GPa for Ti_{0.2} by adding Ti atoms to the CoCrFeMnNi alloy system, suggesting good solid solution strengthening effects. With the further addition of Ti, the Ti_{0.8} film had a maximum hardness of 8.99 GPa. The increase in hardness was due to both the lattice distortion effect and the presence of the amorphous phase that was attributed to the addition of the larger Ti atoms to the CoCrFeMnNi alloy system. This is different from CoCrFeMnNiTix HEAs because the bulk alloy has intermetallic precipitate in the matrix. The reason is the difference in cooling rate, i.e., the preparation method of the bulk HEAs has slower cooling rate and thus intermetallic compound will appear in HEAs. Instead, HEAFs have higher cooling rate and limit the diffusion rate, so they seldom have intermetallic phases. And the reduced modulus in Ti_{0.2} and Ti_{0.8} are 157.81 and 151.42 GPa, respectively. Other HEAFs were successfully fabricated by the magnetron sputtering technique and the hardness and the related modulus values are listed in Table 1.

For nitride-HEAFs, Huang et al. prepared (AlCrNbSiTiV)N films and investigated the effect of nitrogen content on structure and mechanical properties. They found that both values of hardness (41 GPa) and elastic modulus (360 GPa) reached a maximum when R_{N} = 28%. The (AlCrMoTaTiZr)N_{x} film deposited at R_{N} = 40% with the highest hardness of 40.2 GPa and elastic modulus of 420 GPa. Chang et al. fabricated (TiVCrAlZr)N on silicon substrates under different R_{N} = 0 ~ 66.7%. At R_{N} = 50%, the hardness and elastic modulus of the films reached maximum values of 11 and 151 GPa. Liu et al. studied the (FeCoNiCuVZrAl)N HEAFs and increased the R_{N} ratio from 0 to 50%. They observed both values of hardness and elastic modulus exhibited maxima of 12 and 166 GPa with an amorphous structure at R_{N} = 30%. Other related nitride-based HEAFs are summarized in Table 2. Compared to pure metallic HEAFs (Table 1), most nitride-based films have larger hardness and elastic modulus due to the formation of binary compound consisting of nitrogen. However, there are still some films possessing relatively low hardness, which are smaller than 20 GPa because of the inclusion of non-nitride-forming elements.

There have been many studies focused on the HEAFs and designed different compositions and techniques. The grain size, phase transformation, structure, densification, residual stress, and the content of nitrogen, carbon, and oxygen also can affect the values of hardness and elastic modulus. Therefore, they still delve into the correlation between the microstructures and mechanical properties and their related applications.

Table 1. The published papers regarding the pure metallic HEAFs and their phase, hardness and related modulus values via magnetron sputtering method.

Composition	Phase	Hardness (GPa)	Related modulus (GPa)	Reference
CrMnFeCoNi	FCC	5.71	Er = 172.84	
CoCrFeMnNiAl_{1.3}	BCC	8.74	Er = 167.19	
Al_{0.3}CoCrFeNi	FCC + BCC	11.09	E = 186.01	
CrCoCuFeNi	FCC + BCC	15	E = 181	
CoCrFeMnNiTi_{0.2}	FCC	8.61	Er = 157.81	
CoCrFeMnNiTi_{0.8}	Amorphous	8.99	Er = 151.42	
CoCrFeMnNiV_{0.07}	FCC	7.99	E = 206.4	
CoCrFeMnNiV_{1.1}	Amorphous	8.69	E = 144.6	
(CoCrFeMnNi)_{99.5}Mo_{0.5}	FCC	4.62	Er = 157.76	
(CoCrFeMnNi)_{85.4}Mo_{14.6}	Amorphous	8.77	Er = 169.17	
(CoCrFeMnNi)_{92.8}Nb_{7.2}	Amorphous	8.1	Er ~105	
TiZrNbHfTa	FCC	5.4	—	
FeCoNiCrCuAlMn	FCC + BCC	4.2	—	
FeCoNiCrCuAl_{0.5}	FCC	4.4	—	
AlCrMnMoNiZr	Amorphous	7.2	E = 172	
AlCrMoTaTiZr	Amorphous	11.2	E = 193	
AlCrTiTaZr	Amorphous	9.3	E = 140	
AlCrMoNbZr	BCC + Amorphous	11.8	—	
AlCrNbSiTiV	Amorphous	10.4	E = 177	
AlCrSiTiZr	Amorphous	11.5	E ~206	
CrNbSiTaZr	Amorphous	20.12	—	
CrNbSiTiZr	Amorphous	9.6	E = 179.7	
AlFeCrNiMo	BCC	4.98	—	
CuMoTaWV	BCC	19	E = 259	
TiVCrZrHf	Amorphous	8.3	E = 104.7	
ZrTaNbTiW	Amorphous	4.7	E = 120	
TiVCrAlZr	Amorphous	8.2	E = 128.9	
FeCoNiCuVZrAl	Amorphous	8.6	E = 153	

Table 2. Current publications regarding the nitride-based HEAFs and their structures, the related hardness and elastic modulus values.

Composition	R_{N} (%)	Phase	Hardness (GPa)	Elastic Modulus (GPa)	Reference
(FeCoNiCuVZrAl)N	30	Amorphous	12	E = 166	
(TiZrNbHfTa)N	25	FCC	32.9	—	
(TiVCrAlZr)N	50	FCC	11	E = 151	
(AlCrTaTiZr)N	14	FCC	32	E = 368	
(FeCoNiCrCuAl_{0.5})N	33.3	Amorphous	10.4	—	
(FeCoNiCrCuAlMn)N	23.1	Amorphous	11.8	—	
(AlCrMnMoNiZr)N	50	FCC	11.9	E = 202	
(TiVCrZrHf)N	3.85	FCC	23.8	E = 267.3	
(NbTiAlSiW)N	16.67	Amorphous	13.6	E = 154.4	
(NbTiAlSi)N	16.67	FCC	20.5	E = 206.8	
(AlCrNbSiTiV)N	5	FCC	35	E ~ 337	
(AlCrNbSiTiV)N	28	FCC	41	E = 360	
(AlCrTaTiZr)N	50	FCC	36	E = 360	
(Al_{23.1}Cr_{30.8}Nb_{7.7}Si_{7.7}Ti_{30.7})N_{50}	—	FCC	36.1	E ~ 430	
(Al_{29.1}Cr_{30.8}Nb_{11.2}Si_{7.7}Ti_{21.2})N_{50}	—	FCC	36.7	E ~ 380	
(AlCrSiTiZr)N	5	Amorphous	17	E ~ 232	
(AlCrSiTiZr)N	30	FCC	16	E ~ 232	
(AlCrMoTaTiZr)N	40	FCC	40.2	E = 420	
(AlCrTaTiZr)N	50	FCC	35	E = 350	
(CrTaTiVZr)N	20	FCC	34.3	E ~ 268	
(CrNbTiAlV)N	67.86	FCC	35.3	E = 353.7	
(HfNbTiVZr)N	33.33	FCC	7.6	E = 270	

== High-entropy ultra-high temperature ceramics ==
A subset of ultra-high temperature ceramics (UHTC) includes high-entropy ultra-high temperature ceramics, also referred to as compositionally complex ceramics (CCC). This class of materials is a leading choice for applications that experience extreme conditions, such as hypersonic applications which endure very high temperature, corrosion, and high strain rates. In general, UHTCs possess desirable properties including high melting temperature, high thermal conductivity, high stiffness and hardness, and high corrosion resistance. CCCs exemplify the tunability of UHTC systems by adding in more elements to the overall composition in approximately equimolar proportions. These high-entropy materials have displayed enhanced mechanical properties and performance compared to the traditional UHTC system.

As an emerging field, a fully comprehensive relationship between composition, microstructure, processing, and properties is not yet completely developed. Therefore, there is a lot of ongoing research in this field to better understand this system and its ability to scale to implementation in extreme environment applications. A multitude of factors contribute to the elevated mechanical properties in CCC. Notably, the complex microstructure and particular processing parameters enables these systems to display improved properties such as higher hardness. A plausible reason as to why CCCs may exhibit even higher hardness than traditional UHTCs may be due to the integration of various transition metals of different sizes in the CCC high-entropy lattice, rather than just a single repeating element of the same size in the metallic sites. Plastic deformation in materials is due to the movement of dislocations. Generally speaking, increased movement of dislocations throughout the lattice leads to deformation, while inhibition of dislocation motion leads to less deformation and a harder material. In ceramics, dislocation motion is extremely limited due to more constraints in the ceramic bonding structure, which explains their higher hardness over metals. Since the CCC structure has a wider variety of elemental sizes, it will become even more difficult for any dislocations to move in these systems, increasing the strain energy needed to move dislocations. This phenomenon may explain the further improved hardness that is observed. In addition to the direct effects that the microstructure has on enhancing properties, optimizing processing parameters for CCCs is crucial. For instance, powders may be processed using high energy ball milling (HEBM) which relies on the principle of mechanical alloying. Mechanical alloying balances competing mechanisms of deformation and recovery, including micro-forging, cold welding, and fracturing. With the proper balance achieved, this processing step yields a refined and homogeneous powder, which subsequently facilitates proper densification of the final part and desirable mechanical properties. Incomplete densification or an unacceptable fraction of voids diminishes the overall mechanical properties, as it would lead to premature failure. To conclude, high-entropy UHTCs or CCCs are extremely promising candidates for applications in extreme environments as evidenced so far by their enhanced properties.

== Characterization ==
High entropy alloys represent an emerging class of materials that are being discovered and designed through various combinatorial experimental approaches and CALPHAD-based methods. Microstructural and compositional characterization of these novel alloys is essential for tuning their properties, engineering their microstructures, and refining the design and discovery process for new alloys. X-ray and electron-based techniques are widely used to characterize a broad range of materials, from soft matter to complex alloys. For instance, the combination of electron microscopy (including both imaging and elemental analysis) with X-ray diffraction provides a powerful approach for unravelling the crystal structures and compositions of materials. Newly designed high entropy alloys would need to be characterized in a multi-scale manner to help the researchers tune their properties and optimize the different alloy design approaches. Here are some well-known and extensively used X-ray and electron-based techniques which reveal beneficial microstructural features:

=== Imaging using electron microscopy techniques ===
- Scanning Electron Microscopy (SEM): SEM can reveal structural features in HEAs at sub-micron to nanoscale resolution. Different detectors provide complementary information:
  - Secondary Electron (SE) detectors provide topographical contrast and are widely used to analyze surface morphology, fracture surfaces, and particle shape/size.
  - Backscattered Electron (BSE) detectors provide atomic-number contrast, making them useful for identifying phase formation, segregation, phase morphology, and grain structure.
- Transmission Electron Microscopy (TEM): TEM enables characterization of microstructural features at much smaller length scales, including atomic resolution:

High-Resolution TEM (HRTEM) can directly image atomic structures, making it suitable for studying nanotwins, stacking faults, and order-disorder phase boundaries in HEAs. High-Angle Annular Dark-Field (HAADF) detectors in STEM mode provide Z-contrast atomic-resolution imaging, enabling visualization of elemental ordering, segregation, and atomic-scale compositional variations.

=== Crystallographic analysis using electron- and X-ray-based methods ===
- Electron Backscatter Diffraction (EBSD) in SEM can measure grain structures, phase distributions, crystallographic orientations, and texture from polished surfaces at micrometer and sub-micrometer scales.
- Selected-Area Electron Diffraction (SAED) and nano-diffraction in TEM can identify crystal structures, twin boundaries, stacking faults, and short-range ordering at the nanoscale.
- Laboratory X-ray diffraction (XRD) using Cu source is one of the most accessible and versatile methods for identifying phases present in HEAs across different processing conditions.
- Synchrotron X-ray techniques, combined with high-frame-rate detectors, enable in-situ tracking of phase evolution during manufacturing processes (such as additive manufacturing, laser cladding) and post-processing (like annealing, heat treatment).
- X-ray total scattering and Pair Distribution Function (PDF) analysis allow the detection of short-range atomic order that may not be captured using conventional XRD, which is particularly important in chemically complex HEAs.

=== Compositional analysis using electron microscopy and X-ray techniques ===
- Energy-Dispersive X-ray Spectroscopy (EDS) in SEM and TEM provides elemental maps and allows quantification of phase compositions, segregation, and chemical homogeneity.
- Extended X-ray Absorption Fine Structure (EXAFS) probes element-specific local atomic environments and coordination, which is especially valuable for HEAs where multiple elements contribute significantly to the local bonding environment.

== See also ==
- Amorphous metal
- High-entropy-alloy nanoparticles
- Nanocrystalline material
- Hume-Rothery rules
