= Liquid-feed flame spray pyrolysis =

Metal oxide powder production method

Liquid–feed flame spray pyrolysis (LF-FSP) is one of the most recent iterations in flame spray pyrolysis (FSP) powder production technology. FSP produces metal oxide powders from highly volatile gaseous metal chlorides that are decomposed/oxidized in hydrogen-oxygen flames to form nano-oxide powders. However, products made from FSP's vapor-phase process are limited to Al-, Ti-, Zr-, and Si-based oxides from their metal chlorides. Thus, interest in producing more complex materials required a new methodology, LF-FSP.

LF-FSP, as invented at the University of Michigan, uses metalloorganic precursors such as metal carboxylates or alkoxides, not metal chlorides. Briefly, alcohol (typically ethanol) solutions containing 1–10 wt % loading of the target ceramic components as precursors are aerosolized with O_{2} into a quartz chamber and ignited with methane pilot torches. Initial combustion temperatures run 1500–2000 °C, depending on the processing conditions, generating nanopowder "soot". Temperatures drop to 300–500 °C over 1.5 m, equivalent to a 1000 °C quench in 100 ms leading to kinetic products and nanopowders that are unaggregated. Production rates can be 200 g/h when using wire-in-tube electrostatic precipitators operating at 10 kV. Typical powders have 15–100 nm average particle sizes (APS) with specific surface areas of 30–100 m^{2}/g. LF-FSP technology can be used to produce mixed and single metal oxides easily from low-cost starting materials in a single step without forming harmful byproducts like HCl, which forms when metal chlorides are used as precursors.

== Process ==
Initially, metalloorganic precursors are dissolved in alcohol, typically ethanol, to a desired ceramic loading. For further explanation on precursors, refer to precursors section below. The mass of final ceramic oxide can be calculated with the ceramic yield and the amount of precursors used. The production process, called as "shooting", refers broadly to aerosolizing the dissolved liquid precursor solution and combusting it in the flame. Metal oxides are produced, having final stoichiometries determined by the precursor solution compositions.

Production rates depend on the precursor solution's ceramic yield; this can be understood practically as the number of metal atoms injected into the flame per volume of liquid. Additionally, particle collection efficiency is important to minimize waste and loss. The collection efficiency is defined as mass of powder collected over theoretically expected mass. While "shooting", a portion of powder flows into exhaust without being deposited onto the electrostatic precipitators (ESP), and during collection of powder which is done by brushing it off, powder loss occurs which causes deviation of mass of collected powder from theoretically expected value. In laboratory settings, production rates can range from 10 to 300 g/hour, producing uniform, unaggregated nanoparticles with APS between 15 and 100 nm. Commercially, Nanocerox holds an exclusive license for LF-FSP and can produce 4 kg/hour quantities via the continuous process.

Typically, the solvent serves as the fuel; thus cost and solubility issues leads to use of ethanol or other "low cost" alcohols to dissolve the precursors. The oxygen/alcohol aerosol undergoes rapid combustion within milliseconds, oxidizing all the organic components at temperatures up to 2000 °C leaving only metal-oxyanions e.g., (M-O)_{x} in the gas phase. These oxyanions thereafter nucleate to form clusters and finally sub-100 nm particles, as seen in Figure 1.

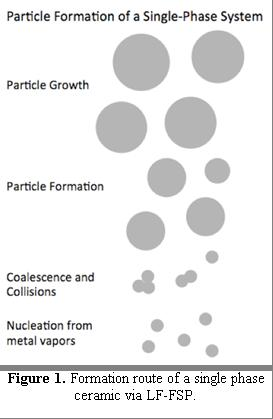

Combustion of the precursor results in oxidation of ligands/adducts generating vapors that likely consist of gaseous metal ions and oxyanion species, which co-react to nucleate and grow to form clusters of metal oxide bonds.

These clusters condense to form nuclei, which subsequently grow by consuming the vapor phase species and bonding with oxygen available in the atmosphere. In this context, the term cluster refers to the initially generated species that form as a vapor. These clusters coalesce to form nuclei, which later form stable particles.

Once formed, nuclei collide to coalesce or agglomerate where temperature and species dictate the mechanism. Cooling changes the effect of collision from coalescence to agglomeration. LF-FSP's rapid drop in temperature as the particles exit the flame prevents the formation of aggregate. Definition of aggregate and its detrimental effect is discussed in advantages section. Collisions that take place after the temperature drop result in agglomerates, in which particles bond weakly by Van der Waals forces, and they can be separated easily with ultrasonication or ball-milling.

While exceptions exist, most flame-made particles are nano-sized (< 100 nm) and highly crystalline. Also, neither phase separation within each particle nor composition variance among particles is observed, as the entire process is so rapid that atomically mixed particles are formed. Their properties stem from the flame temperature (up to 2000 °C) and high cooling rates (>500 °C/s). Low residence times in the flame (the amount of time metal ions spend in the flame zone) and rapid cooling lead to metastable phase formation and more importantly unaggregated particles, as they do not have the energy to coalesce and neck. The purity of the initial reactants largely drives the final powder's purity. Some carbonate species may be present on as-produced powders; however, processing techniques can minimize these impurities in final products. First, the powder is dispersed in a solvent via ultrasonication and left to sit for 8 to 12 hours, which leads to some small fraction of larger particles, mostly carbonates, settling at the bottom. The suspension is separated from the sediment and is dried in an oven before being ground into a powder. Thus, LF-FSP provides a robust, versatile route to single and mixed-metal oxide powders in the 15–100 nm size range with varying phase and morphology from relatively low-cost organic precursors.

== Equipment ==
A LF-FSP apparatus has five components: aerosol generator with fluid feed and reservoir, cylindrical quartz combustion chamber, Y-shaped quartz tube, four wire-in-cylinder electrostatic precipitators (ESPs) connected in parallel-series, and exhaust piping.

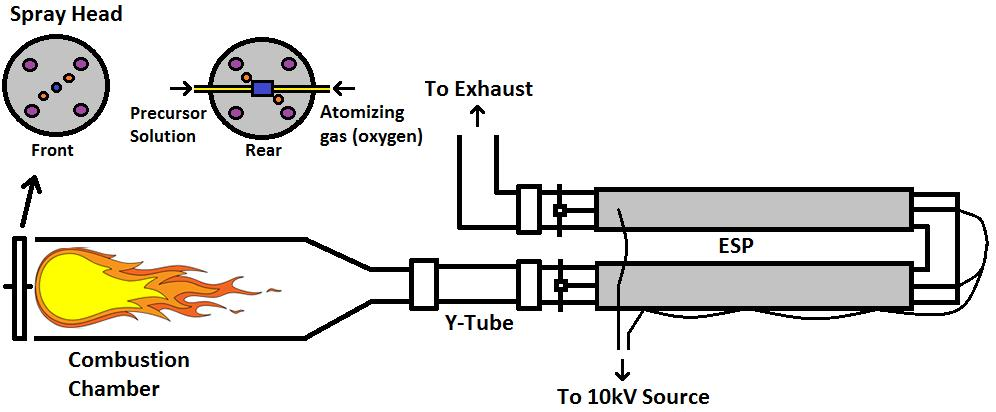
Figure 2. Schematic of LF-FSP apparatus. In spray head, purple, orange and blue correspond to auxiliary oxygen, ignition torch, and aerosol generator, respectively.

The precursor, typically a single- or mixed-metal alkoxide, or carboxylate dissolved in ethanol at 1–10 wt% is introduced to the combustion chamber via twin, high-shear fluid (Bernoulli) aerosol generators with oxygen as the atomizing gas. The aerosol generator is composed of a precursor delivery tube oriented perpendicularly to a high-velocity oxygen flow tube. The twin aerosol generators provide high throughput of the precursor solution and stabilize the flame. Two methane pilot torches made of alumina are used to ignite the aerosol. The ensuing combustion results in flame temperatures of 1500–2000 °C, depending on the solvent, precursor loading, and rate of aerosolization. The precursor vaporizes on combustion and subsequently gets converted to nanoparticles in the flame. Temperatures drop to 300–500 °C over a 1.5 m length of the combustion chamber, which is equivalent to a 1000 °C quench in ≤ 100 ms. The process leads to kinetic products and nanopowders that are largely unaggregated.

The resulting nanopowders are collected by electrophoretic deposition in a parallel-series arrangement of wire-in-aluminum tube electrostatic precipitators (ESPs). A direct current bias of 5–10 kV is applied between the wire and the ESP wall, which induces particle deposition on both the wall and the wire.

== Precursors ==
Metal alkoxides, carboxylates such as alumatrane [Al(OCH_{2}CH_{2})_{3}N], silatrane Si(OCH_{2}CH_{2})_{3}N[OCH_{2}CH_{2}N(CH_{2}CH_{2}OH)_{2}], and zirconium propionate [Zr(O_{2}CCH_{2}CH_{3})_{2}-(OH)_{2}], are generally used, and they are dissolved in an alcohol solvent such as methanol or ethanol. Solubility of the precursor in alcohol is an important property, which is controlled by the ligands. Too much carbon in the ligand may promote formation of metal carbonate as a secondary minor phase since enormous amounts of CO_{2} are generated on combustion which may react with metal oxides. Too little carbon in the ligand will limit the solubility of precursor in alcohol. The process is inexpensive as metal oxides, hydroxides, carbonates or nitrates can be used as starting points for precursor synthesis. For mixed-metal oxides, one can either synthesize a double-alkoxide which contains two metal elements such as magnesium aluminum double alkoxide as shown in Table 1, or simply mix different alkoxide and/or carboxylates in stoichiometric ratios. For example, LF-FSP products of alumatrane and silatrane glycolate dissolved in ethanol at 3:1 molar ratio is mullite (3Al_{2}O_{3}•2SiO_{2}). Stoichiometry of nanopowder made through LF-FSP corresponds to that of its precursor. Flame spray pyrolysis has also been carried out with inexpensive inorganic salts instead of metalloorganic precursors. In one study, tin(II) chloride dihydrate dissolved in ethanol, with an indium chloride added for doping at 2–8 mol%, was nebulized with oxygen into a liquefied petroleum gas flame. This produced phase-pure cassiterite SnO_{2} and indium-doped SnO_{2} nanopowders in a single step, with particles of roughly 10–30 nm. X-ray photoelectron spectroscopy confirmed indium in the 3+ oxidation state, and the powders were transparent in the visible range, with an optical band gap that decreased as the indium content increased.

=== Metal alkoxides ===
One way to make a metal alkoxide precursor is through a simple "one-pot" synthesis. Alkoxide precursors of single or mixed metal-oxides are prepared this way. In this process, an ethylene glycol suspension of metal oxide or hydroxides with triethanolamine is heated at 200 °C. The reaction proceeds by dissolving the starting materials while concurrently removing byproduct water to form a clear solution. Excluding oxygen, hydrogen, carbon, and nitrogen, the ratio of different metal elements in the alkoxide corresponds to the stoichiometry of the LF-FSP made nanoparticles. Examples of alkoxides that have been used in LF-FSP are shown in Table 1.

Table 1. Examples of metal alkoxides.

| Precursor | Synthesis | LF-FSP Product |
|---|---|---|
| Alumatrane | | Al_{2}O_{3} |
| Titanatrane Glycolate | | TiO_{2} |
| Silatrane Glycolate | | SiO_{2} |
| Magnesium Aluminum double alkoxide | | MgAl_{2}O_{4} |

=== Metal carboxylates ===
Metal carbonates or nitrates can be reacted with excess carboxylic acid (e.g. propionic acid) in a flask equipped with a still head and an addition funnel. N_{2} is sparged into the solution as the solution is heated to 120 °C and maintained until all of byproduct water and appropriate amount of excess carboxylic acid are removed with the aid of N_{2} flow. Additional gaseous byproducts CO_{2} and (NO)_{x} are produced for metal carbonates and nitrates respectively. Pure carboxylates are typically ground to powder to facilitate dissolution in alcohol. Table 2 provides examples of common metal carboxylates that have been used in LF-FSP.

Table 2. Examples of metal carboxylates.

| Precursor | Synthesis | LF-FSP Product |
|---|---|---|
| Cerium Propionate | Ce_{2}(CO_{3})_{3}•x(H_{2}O) + 8CH_{3}CH_{2}COOH → 2Ce(O_{2}CCH_{2}CH_{3})_{3}(OH) / byproduct: H_{2}O, CO_{2} | CeO_{2} |
| Zirconium Propionate | ZrO_{2}(CO_{2}) •x(H_{2}O) + 4CH_{3}CH_{2}COOH → Zr(O_{2}CCH_{2}CH_{3})_{2}(OH)_{2} / byproduct: H_{2}O, CO_{2} | ZrO_{2} |
| Yttrium Propionate | Y(NO_{3})_{3}•6H_{2}O + 3CH_{3}CH_{2}COOH → Y(O_{2}CCH_{2}CH_{3})_{3} / byproduct: H_{2}O, (NO)_{x} | Y_{2}O_{3} |

== Advantages ==
LF-FSP offers several advantages over other nanopowder production methods. A key problem in nanopowder synthesis is the use of expensive raw materials. These expensive raw materials include metal chloride precursors, which are highly corrosive. Protective construction of equipment is needed when using metal chloride precursors in FSP. In addition, toxic, polluting byproducts need to be disposed. In LF-FSP, organometallic precursors are used which do not pose this problem. Due to the use of non-corrosive precursors, LF-FSP does not require protective equipment and disposal of toxic byproducts. Also, organometallic precursors are low-cost and easy to produce. For instance, silatrane glycolate, a precursor in the production of SiO_{2} through LF-FSP, can be synthesized in kilogram quantities in one step from silica.

Another problem in nanopowder synthesis is the difficulty in controlling the size, size distribution, and agglomeration of particles. Milling, grinding, jet milling, crushing, and micronization are conventionally used for particle size reduction. However, neither the particle size can reach the nanoscale, nor are the shapes uniform. LF-FSP directly produces nanopowders that are not possible via grinding. Uniform particle size distributions are obtained using LF-FSP as it is a vapor phase process. For instance, Al_{2}O_{3} nanopowders produced from LF-FSP have an average particle size (APS) of 20–150 nm with a log-normal particle size distribution.

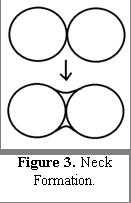

Obtaining a final product with high purity and relatively narrow size distribution is much easier compared to alternatives, and such powders do not require additional powder processing which may result in introduction of impurities. Aggregation is another key problem in nanopowder synthesis. Aggregates contain discrete primary particles that are necked. Particle necking refers to particles, which chemically bond together from the diffusion of atoms to the particles' interface in the presence of a driving force, such as heat. Neck formation is shown in Figure 3. A major disadvantage of vapor-fed FSP is the formation of hard agglomerates in the gas phase. As a result, it leads to difficulties in producing high-quality, bulk materials. LF-FSP largely avoids this problem by limiting aggregation through rapid quenching.

LF-FSP can be used to produce nanopowders in commercial quantities, while other nano-powder synthesis methods have low production rates. For example, hydrothermal processing of nanoparticles in supercritical water can produce nanopowders at a rate of 10–15 g/h. Production rates of nanopowders using LF-FSP is significantly greater. For example, Nanocerox can produce nanopowders up to 4 kilogram/hour using LF-FSP.

Common methods of producing coated nanoparticles are primarily based on solution phase methods and sol-gel processing, which are multi-step processes. These multi-step processes are inefficient in cost, time and homogeneity of the final product. Also, the disposal of solvents is costly. These coated nanoparticles include ZrO_{2} coated Al_{2}O_{3}, SiO_{2} coated ZrO_{2}, and SnO_{2} coated ZrO_{2}. However, LF-FSP has the potential to provide simple and efficient routes to coated nanopowder production without aggregation. LF-FSP allows access to core–shell nanoparticles of (ZrO_{2})_{1−x}(Al_{2}O_{3})_{x}, which can be produced in a single step.

== Applications ==
=== Laser applications ===
LF-FSP can produce a wide variety of nanopowders for multiple applications. Yttrium aluminum garnet or YAG (Y_{3}Al_{5}O_{12}) doped with rare earth metals (Ce^{3+}, Pr^{3+}, or Nd^{3+}) can be produced through LF-FSP, which have phosphor and laser applications. YAG doped with rare earth metals, Nd:YAG for example, show electron pump lasing behavior. The small particle size of the rare earth metals provide optical feedback. YAG has been studied because of their high temperature mechanical strength and photonic properties. The development of YAG nanopowders that are easily sintered to full density and transparency have been studied because transparent polycrystalline YAG lasers outperform single crystal YAG lasers.

=== Catalyst applications ===
Nanopowders produced from LF-FSP can be used for several catalytic applications. If nanocatalysts aggregate, their activity is lower due to the decrease in surface area. LF-FSP allows the production of nanocatalyst with minimal aggregation. It is known that bimetallic and trimetallic catalysts offer improved properties over single metal catalysts. Bimetallic nanocatalysts have been produced via LF-FSP. NiO-Co_{3}O_{4}, NiO-MoO_{3}, and NiO-CuO are used for several types of catalytic reactions. For example, NiO-Co_{3}O_{4} nanoparticles are used as catalysts for the production of fuels and chemicals, and the reduction of environmental pollution. CeO_{2}/ZrO_{2} catalysts have been studied for automotive catalytic converters. CeO_{2}/ZrO_{2} catalysts have been added to catalytic systems for the elimination and reduction of the pollutants contained in the exhaust gases of vehicles.

=== Composite applications ===
Zirconia toughened alumina composites are composed of Al_{2}O_{3} and ZrO_{2} nanopowders, which are producible via LF-FSP. Zirconia toughened alumina has been studied for its high toughness and resistance to wear and has biomedical applications. It has the potential to produce tougher and harder ceramic surfaces that may be used for ceramic hip implants. The lifetime of such implants depends on the surface quality. Zirconia toughened alumina implants offer increased component life and a more cost effective long term solution.

=== Military applications ===
Alpha (α)-alumina produced with an APS of less than 100 nm may be used for manufacturing transparent armor. Transparent armor provides enhanced protection against severe ballistic and blast threats. Traditional bullet proof glass cannot stop a .50-caliber armor-piercing round. This clear ceramic α-alumina material can stop a round from an anti-aircraft gun and a .50-caliber gun. In addition, it is half as heavy and thick as bullet-resistant glass. In the future, this material may be incorporated in a wide range of vehicles including lightly armored trucks to low-flying planes.

=== Self-cleaning applications ===
Uniform TiO_{2} nanoparticles have been produced using the LF-FSP process, which have potential applications in producing self-cleaning windows, paint, interior furnishings, and aluminum siding. In addition, TiO_{2} has been used for self-sterilizing applications in hospitals and bathrooms. For instance, Optimus Services LLC has incorporated TiO_{2} into the tiles used to cover the floor and walls of medical operating rooms. TiO_{2} is currently the leading material for self-cleaning applications due to its high photocatalytic activity, chemical inertness, mechanical properties, and low cost.

=== Other applications ===
Table 3 lists several potential applications of nanopowders produced from LF-FSP.

Table 3. Nanopowders produced from LF-FSP and their potential applications.

| LF-FSP Product | Average Particle Size (nm) | Applications |
|---|---|---|
| CaO | 20–40 | Flame retardant, clean-up of toxic contamination from chemical warfare |
| CeO_{2} | 30–90 | Buffer layer for superconductors, coatings for infrared filters, coloring agents for plastics, oxidation resistant coatings, heat resistant alloy coatings |
| MgO | 20–40 | Fire retardant used for chemical fiber and plastics trades, high temperature dehydrating agent, fuel additive, antistatic agent, corrosion inhibitor |
| SiO_{2} | 20–30 | Paint, plastics, paints, adhesives, cosmetics, glass, steel, color rubber, magnetic materials |
| TiO_{2} | 20–60 | Water purification, indoor/outdoor air cleaners, self-cleaning material for roads (tunnel walls, traffic signs) |
| ZrO_{2} | 40 | Ceramic pigments, high-capacity capacitors, optical storage, abrasive material, insulating material, high-temperature and corrosion resisting components |
| δ-Al_{2}O_{3} | 20–40 | Abrasion-resistant coatings, semiconductor polishing |
| α-Al_{2}O_{3} | sub-100 | Tough prosthetic implants, transparent armor, polycrystalline lasers |

=== See also ===
Nanomaterials synthesis
