= Severe plastic deformation =

Group of metalworking techniques

Severe plastic deformation (SPD) is a generic term describing a group of metalworking techniques — or more generally, solid-state mechanical processes — that involve very large strains, resulting in a high defect density, "ultrafine" grain (UFG) sizes (d < 1000 nm) or sometimes nanocrystalline (NC) structures (d < 100 nm), and phase transitions.

== History ==
The significance of SPD was known from ancient times, at least during the transition from the Bronze Age to the Iron Age, when the repeated hammering and folding method was employed for processing strategic tools such as swords. The development of the principles underlying SPD techniques goes back to the pioneering work of P.W. Bridgman at Harvard University in the 1930s. His work focused on the effects of combining large hydrostatic pressures with concurrent shear deformation in solids, and it led to the award of the Nobel Prize in Physics in 1946. Very successful early implementations of these principles, described in more detail below, are the processes of equal-channel angular pressing (ECAP) developed by V.M. Segal and co-workers in Minsk in the 1970s and high-pressure torsion, derived from Bridgman's work, but not widely developed until the 1980s in Ufa and at the Russian Institute of Metals Physics in modern-day Yekaterinburg.

Some definitions of SPD describe it as a process in which high strain is applied without any significant change in the dimensions of the workpiece, resulting in a large hydrostatic pressure component. However, the mechanisms that lead to grain refinement in SPD are the same as those originally developed for mechanical alloying, a powder process that has been characterized as "severe plastic deformation" by authors as early as 1983. Additionally, some more recent processes such as asymmetric rolling do result in a change in the dimensions of the workpiece, while still producing an ultrafine grain structure. The principles behind SPD have even been applied to surface treatments.

== Methods ==
SPD methods are classified into three main categories: bulk-SPD methods, surface-SPD methods, and powder-SPD methods. Below, some popular SPD methods are briefly explained.

=== Equal-channel angular pressing ===
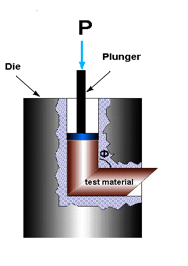
During the ECAE process, the material is pressed through an angular die and experiences shear deformation without changing its cross-sectional dimensions.

Equal-channel angular extrusion (ECAE), sometimes called equal-channel angular pressing (ECAP), was developed in the 1970s. In this process, a metal billet is pressed through an angled channel, typically 90°. To achieve optimal results, the process may be repeated several times, changing the orientation of the billet with each pass. This produces a uniform shear throughout the bulk of the material.

=== High-pressure torsion ===
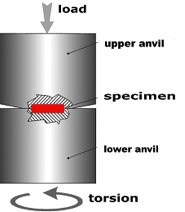
During the constrained HPT process, the material experiences shear deformation between a fixed and a rotating anvil, without any change in its original dimensions.

High-pressure torsion (HPT) can be traced back to the experiments that won Percy Bridgman the 1946 Nobel Prize in Physics, though its use in metal processing is considerably more recent. In this method, a disk of the material to be strained is placed between two anvils. A large compressive stress (typically several gigapascals) is applied, while one anvil is rotated to create a torsion force. HPT can be performed in three modes: unconstrained, in which the material is free to flow outward, fully constrained, or partially constrained, where outward flow is allowed, but limited.

=== Accumulative roll-bonding ===
In accumulative roll-bonding (ARB), two sheets of the same material are stacked, heated to below the recrystallization temperature, and rolled together, bonding the sheets together. This sheet is cut in half, the halves are stacked, and the process is repeated several times. Compared to other SPD processes, ARB has the benefit that it does not require specialized equipment or tooling, only a conventional rolling mill. However, the surfaces to be joined must be well-cleaned before rolling to ensure good bonding.

=== Repetitive corrugation and straightening ===
Repetitive corrugation and straightening (RCS) is a severe plastic deformation technique used to process sheet metals. In RCS, a sheet is pressed between two corrugated dies followed by pressing between two flat dies. RCS has gained wide popularity to produce fine grained sheet metals. Endeavors to improve this technique led to the introduction of Repetitive Corrugation and Straightening by Rolling (RCSR), a novel SPD method. The applicability of this new method has been successfully demonstrated across a variety of materials.

=== Asymmetric rolling ===
In asymmetric rolling (ASR), a rolling mill is modified such that one roll has a higher velocity than the other. This is typically done with either independent speed control or by using rolls of different size. This creates a region in which the frictional forces on the top and bottom of the sheet being rolled are opposite, creating shear stresses throughout the material in addition to the normal compressive stress from rolling. Unlike other SPD processes, ASR does not maintain the same net shape, but the effect on the microstructure of the material is similar.

=== Mechanical alloying ===
Mechanical alloying/milling (MA/MM) performed in a high-energy ball mill such as a shaker mill or planetary mill will also induce severe plastic deformation in metals. During milling, particles are fractured and cold welded together, resulting in large deformations. The end product is generally a powder that must then be consolidated in some way (often using other SPD processes), but some alloys have the ability to consolidate in-situ during milling. Mechanical alloying also allows powders of different metals to be alloyed together during processing.

=== Surface treatments ===
More recently, the principles behind SPD have been used to develop surface treatments that create a nanocrystalline layer on the surface of a material. In the surface mechanical attrition treatment (SMAT), an ultrasonic horn is connected to a 20 kHz transducer, with small balls on top of the horn. The workpiece is mounted a small distance above the horn. The high frequency results in a large number of collisions between the balls and the surface, creating a strain rate on the order of 10^{2}–10^{3} s^{−1}. The NC surface layer developed can be on the order of 50 μm thick. The process is similar to shot peening, but the kinetic energy of the balls is much higher in SMAT.

Another recently developed technique is ultrasonic nanocrystalline surface modification (UNSM). In the UNSM process, not only the static load, but also the dynamic load are exerted. The treatment involves striking the surface up to 20,000 times per second using a ball attached to the horn, with impact densities ranging from 1,000 to 100,000 strikes per square millimeter. The strikes, which can be described as cold-forging, introduce SPD to produce a NC surface layer by refining the coarse grains to the nanometer scale without changing the chemical composition of a material. This results in highstrength and ductility. This UNSM technique does not only improve the mechanical and tribological properties of a material, but also produces a corrugated structure with numerous desirable dimples on the treated surface.

== Applications ==
Most research into SPD has focused on grain refinement, which has obvious applications in the development of high-strength materials as a result of the Hall-Petch relation. Conventionally processed industrial metals typically have grain sizes ranging from 10–100 μm. Reducing the grain size from 10 μm to 1 μm can increase the yield strength of metals by more than 100%. Techniques that use bulk materials such as ECAE can provide reliable and relatively inexpensive ways of producing ultrafine grain materials compared to rapid solidification techniques such as melt spinning.

However, other effects of SPD, such as texture modification, has potential industrial applications. Properties such as the Lankford coefficient (important for deep drawing processes) and magnetic properties of electrical steel are highly dependent on texture.

Processes such as ECAE and HPT have also been used to consolidate metal powders and composites without the need for the high temperatures used in conventional consolidation processes such as hot isostatic pressing, allowing desirable characteristics such as nanocrystalline grain sizes or amorphous structures to be retained.

Some known commercial applications of SPD processes are in the production of Sputtering targets by Honeywell and UFG titanium for medical implants.

== Grain refinement mechanism ==
The presence of a high hydrostatic pressure, in combination with large shear strains, is essential for producing high densities of crystal lattice defects, particularly dislocations, which can result in a significant refining of the grains. Grain refinement in SPD processes occurs by a multi-step process:

1. Dislocations, which are initially distributed throughout the grains, rearrange and group together into dislocation "cells" to reduce the total strain energy.
2. As deformation continues, and more dislocations are generated, misorientations develop between the cells, forming "subgrains".
3. The process repeats within the subgrains until the size becomes sufficiently small such that the subgrains can rotate.
4. Additional deformation causes the subgrains to rotate, forming high-angle grain boundaries, typically with equiaxed shapes.

The mechanism by which the subgrains rotate is not fully understood. Wu et al. describe a process in which dislocation motion becomes restricted due to the small subgrain size and grain rotation becomes more energetically favorable. Mishra et al. propose a slightly different explanation, in which the rotation is aided by diffusion along the grain boundaries, which is much faster than through the bulk.

F.A. Mohamad has proposed a model for the minimum grain size achievable using mechanical milling. The model is based on the concept that the grain size is dependent on the rates at which dislocations are generated and annihilated. The full model is given by:

$\frac{d_{min}}{b}=A_3 \left ( e^{-\tfrac{\beta Q}{4RT}} \right ) {\left ( \frac{D_{p0} G b^2 }{\nu_0 k T} \right )}^{0.25} {\left ( \frac{ \gamma }{ G b } \right )}^{0.5} {\left ( \frac{ G }{ H } \right )}^{1.25}$

Where:

- $d_{min}$ is the minimum grain size
- $b$ is the Burgers vector
- $A_{3}$ is a constant
- $\beta=Q_{p}-Q_{m}/Q$, where:
  - $Q_{p}$: activation energy for pipe diffusion along dislocations
  - $Q_{m}$: activation energy for vacancy migration
  - $Q$: activation energy for self-diffusion)
- $\beta Q$: represents the activation energy for recovery
- $R$: gas constant
- $T$: processing temperature.
- $D_{p0}$: temperature-independent component of the pipe diffusion coefficient
- $G$: shear modulus
- $v_{0}$: dislocation velocity
- $k$: Boltzmann constant
- $\gamma$: stacking fault energy
- $H$: hardness.

While the model was developed specifically for mechanical milling, it has also been successfully applied to other SPD processes. Frequently, only parts of the model, particularly the term involving stacking fault energy, are often used, as many parameters are difficult to measure.. This is still useful as it implies that all other things remaining equal, reducing the stacking fault energy, a property that is a function of the alloying elements, will allow for better grain refinement. However, a few studies suggest that despite the significance of stacking fault energy on the grain refinement at the early stages of straining, the steady-state grain size at large strains is mainly controlled by the homologous temperature in pure metals and by the interaction of solute atoms and dislocations in single-phase alloys.
