= High entropy oxide =

Complex oxide molecules that contain five or more metal ions

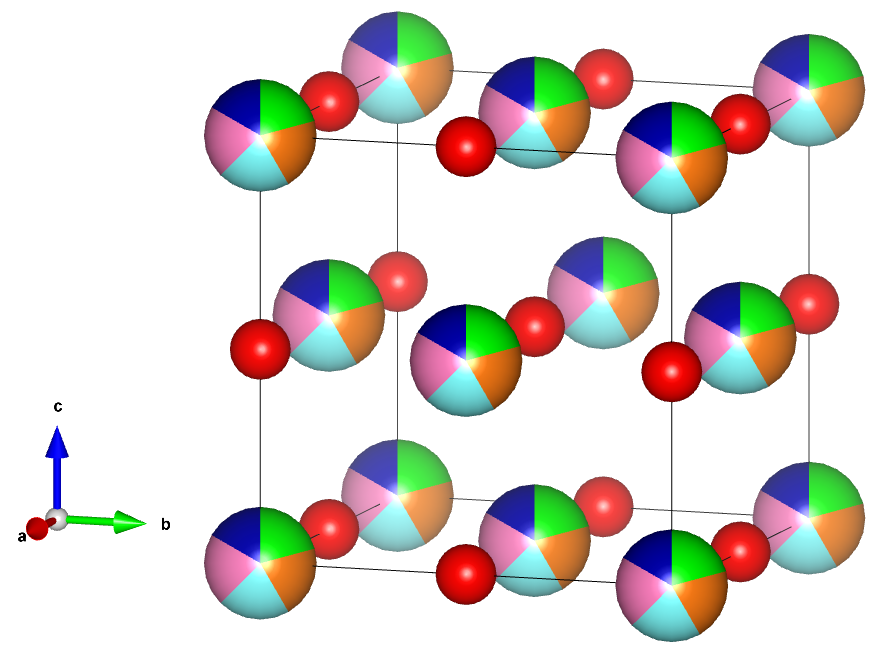
Structure of high-entropy oxide (MgNiCoCuZn)_{0.2}O with site occupancies shown. Oxygen atoms are shown in red.

High-entropy oxides (HEOs) are complex oxides that contain five or more principal metal cations and have a single-phase crystal structure, similar to high-entropy alloys such as the Cantor alloys. The first HEO, (MgNiCuCoZn)_{0.2}O in a rock salt structure, was reported in 2015 by Rost et al. HEOs have been successfully synthesized in many structures, including fluorites, perovskites, and spinels. HEOs are currently being investigated for applications as functional materials.

== History ==
In the realm of high-entropy materials, HEOs are preceded by high-entropy alloys (HEAs), which were first reported by Yeh et al. and Cantor et al. in 2004.HEAs are alloys of five or more principal metallic elements. Some HEAs have been shown to possess desirable mechanical properties, such as retaining strength/hardness at high temperatures. HEA research substantially accelerated in the 2010s.

The first HEO, (MgNiCuCoZn)_{0.2}O in a rock salt structure, was reported in 2015 by Rost et al. Similar to HEAs, (MgNiCuCoZn)_{0.2}O is a multicomponent single-phase material. The cation site in (MgNiCuCoZn)_{0.2}O material is compositionally disordered, similar to HEAs. However, unlike HEAs, (MgNiCuCoZn)_{0.2}O contains an ordered anion sublattice. Following the discovery of HEOs in 2015, the field rapidly expanded.

Since the discovery of HEOs, the field of high-entropy materials has expanded to include high-entropy metal diborides, high-entropy carbides, high-entropy sulfides, and high-entropy alumino-silicides.

== Predicting HEO Formation ==
=== Principle of Entropy Stabilization ===
The formation of HEOs is based on the principle of entropy stabilization. Thermodynamics predicts that the structure which minimizes Gibbs free energy for a given temperature and pressure will form. The formula for Gibbs free energy is given by:

$\Delta G=\Delta H - T\Delta S$

where G is Gibbs free energy, H is enthalpy, T is absolute temperature, and S is entropy. It can clearly be seen from this formula that a large entropy reduces Gibbs free energy and thus favors phase stability. It can also be seen that entropy becomes increasingly important in determining phase stability at higher temperatures. In a multi-component system, one component of entropy is the entropy of mixing ($\Delta S_{mix}$). For an ideal mixture, $\Delta S_{mix}$ takes the form:

$\Delta S_{mix} = -R\sum_{i=1}^n c_i\ln c_i$

where R is the ideal gas constant, n is the number of components, and c_{i} is the atomic fraction of component i. The value of $\Delta S_{mix}$ increases as the number of components increases. For a given number of components, $\Delta S_{mix}$ is maximized when the atomic fractions of the components approach equimolar amounts.

Evidence for entropy stabilization is given by the original rock salt HEO (MgNiCuCoZn)_{0.2}O. Single-phase (MgNiCuCoZn)_{0.2}O may be prepared by solid-state reaction of CuO, CoO, NiO, MgO, and ZnO. Rost et al. reported that under solid state reaction conditions that produce single-phase (MgNiCuCoZn)_{0.2}O, the absence of any one of the five oxide precursors will result in a multi-phase sample, suggesting that configurational entropy stabilizes the material.

=== Other Considerations ===
It can clearly be seen from the formula for Gibbs free energy that enthalpy reduction is another important indicator of phase stability. For an HEO to form, the enthalpy of formation must be sufficiently small to be overcome by configurational entropy. Furthermore, the discussion above assumes that the reaction kinetics allow for the thermodynamically favored phase to form.

== Synthesis Methods ==
=== Solid-State Reaction ===
Bulk samples of HEOs may be prepared by the solid-state reaction method. In this technique, oxide precursors are ball milled and pressed into a green body, which is sintered at a high temperature. The thermal energy provided accelerates diffusion within the green body, allowing new phases to form within the sample. Solid-state reactions are often carried out in the presence of air to allow oxygen-rich and oxygen-deficient mixtures to release and absorb oxygen from the atmosphere, respectively. Oxide precursors are not required to have the same crystal structure as the desired HEO for the solid-state reaction method to be effective. For example, CuO and ZnO may be used as precursors to synthesize (MgNiCuCoZn)_{0.2}O. At room temperature, CuO has the tenorite structure and ZnO has the wurtzite structure.

=== Polymeric Steric Entrapment ===
Polymeric steric entrapment is a wet chemistry technique for synthesizing oxides. It is based on similar principles as the sol–gel process, which has also been used to synthesize HEOs. Polymeric steric entrapment requires water-soluble compounds containing the desired metal cation (e.g., metal acetates, metal chlorides) to be placed in a solution with water and a water-soluble polymer (e.g., PVA, PEG). In solution, the cations are thoroughly mixed and held close together by the polymer chains. The water is driven off to produce a foam whose organic components are burned off with a calcining step, producing a fine and pure mixed oxide powder, which may be pressed into a green body and sintered. This method was first reported by Nguyen et al. in 2011. In 2017, Kriven and Tseng reported the first polymeric steric entrapment HEO synthesis.

Polymeric steric entrapment can be used to synthesize bulk HEO samples that are difficult to successfully synthesize the solid-state method. For example, Musico et al. synthesized the high entropy cuprate (LaNdGdTbDy)_{0.4}CuO_{4} using solid-state reaction and polymeric steric entrapment. X-ray diffraction of the sample prepared with solid-state reaction showed small inclusions of a second phase, and energy-dispersive X-ray spectroscopy showed inhomogeneous distributions of some cations. Neither impurity peaks nor evidence of inhomogeneous cation distribution was found in the sample of this material prepared with polymeric steric entrapment.

=== Aerosol-based and gas-phase methods ===
Aerosol-based methods such as nebulized spray pyrolysis and flame spray pyrolysis (FSP) have also been used to prepare high-entropy oxides. In nebulized spray pyrolysis, a solution of metal salts or organometallic compounds is atomized into droplets that are carried into a heated reactor, where each droplet decomposes into an oxide particle; because the cations are mixed within each droplet, the method suits multicomponent compositions. In FSP, a precursor solution in a flammable solvent is sprayed directly into a flame, giving rapid combustion, nucleation and quenching that limit sintering and allow nanoparticles to form. Because non-volatile precursors can be used, FSP can incorporate elements that are difficult to introduce by vapor-phase routes. Spinel-type high-entropy oxide nanoparticles such as (MnFeNiCuZn)_{3}O_{4} and (ZnNiMnFeTi)_{3}O_{4} have been made this way. Maintaining elemental homogeneity, controlling agglomeration and keeping a narrow particle size distribution at larger production scales remain challenges.

=== Other Techniques ===
Other techniques that have been used to synthesize HEOs include:

- Nebulized spray pyrolysis
- Pulsed laser deposition
- Magnetron sputtering
- Sol-gel method
- Anodizing HEA precursors
- Hot pressing
- Thermolysis of mixed precursors

== HEO Materials ==
The first HEOs synthesized had the rock-salt structure. Since then, the family of HEOs has expanded to include perovskite, spinel, fluorite, and other structures. Some of these structures, such as the perovskite structure, are notable in that they have two cation sites, each of which may independently possess compositional disorder. For example, high entropy perovskites (GdLaNdSmY)_{0.2}MnO_{3} (A-site configurational entropy), Gd(CoCrFeMnNi)_{0.2}O_{3} (B-site configurational entropy), and (GdLaNdSmY)_{0.2}(CoCrFeMnNi)_{0.2}O_{3} (A-site and B-site configurational entropy) have been synthesized.

Examples of HEO materials and their crystal structures
Structure	Example	Reference
Rock Salt	(MgNiCuCoZn)_{0.2}O	Rost et al
Fluorite	(GdLaCeHfZr)_{0.2}O_{2} and (GdLaYHfZr)_{0.2}0_{2}; (CeZrHfSnTi)_{0.2}O_{2}	Anandkumar et al; Chen et al
Spinel	(CoCrFeMnNi)_{0.6}O_{4} (CrMnFeCoNiCuZn)_{0.43}O_{4}	Dabrowa et al Swindell et al
Perovskite	Sr(ZrSnTiHfMn)_{0.2}O_{3}	Jiang et al
Pyrochlore	(GdEuSmNdLa)_{0.4}Zr_{2}O_{7}	Teng et al
Cuprate Perovskite	(LaNdGdTbDy)_{0.4}CuO_{4}	Musico et al

Note: (MgNiCuCoZn)_{0.2}O refers to the lower entropy rock structure MO where the 0.2 value refers to the ideal (equimolar) contribution of an individual cation

The choice of synthesis route influences not only phase stability and achievable compositional complexity, but also defect structure, particle size distribution and microstructure, and therefore the functional properties of the material.

== Properties and Applications ==
In contrast to HEAs, which are typically investigated for their mechanical properties, HEOs are often studied as functional materials. The original HEO, (MgNiCuCoZn)_{0.2}O, has been investigated as a promising material for applications in energy production and storage, e.g. as anode material in Li-ion batteries, or as large k dielectric material, or in catalysis.

=== Low Thermal Conductivity ===
It has been shown that increasing the configurational entropy of a material reduces its lattice thermal conductivity. Correspondingly, HEOs typically have lower thermal conductivities than materials with the same crystal structure and only one cation per lattice site. The thermal conductivity of HEOs is usually greater than or comparable to the thermal conductivity of amorphous materials containing the same components. However, crystalline materials typically have higher elastic moduli than amorphous materials of the same components. The combination of these factors leads to HEOs occupying a unique region of the property space by having the highest elastic modulus to thermal conductivity ratios of all materials.

=== Property Tunability Through Cation Selection ===
HEOs enhance functional property tunability through cation selection. Magnetic, catalytic, and thermophysical properties may be tuned by modifying the cation composition of a given HEO. Many material applications demand a highly specific set of properties. For example, thermal barrier coatings require thermal expansion coefficient matching with a metal surface, high-temperature phase stability, low thermal conductivity, and chemical inertness, among other properties. Due to their innate tunability, HEOs have been proposed as candidates for advanced material applications such as thermal barrier coatings.

== Application in Energy Storage and Conversion ==
=== Electrocatalysis & Heterogenous Catalysis ===
HEOs have shown significant potential as electrocatalysts for key energy conversion reactions, including the oxygen evolution reaction (OER) and the oxygen reduction reaction (ORR). HEOs have also shown promise as more abundant heterogenous catalysts for gaseous reactions such as carbon monoxide (CO) oxidation which is important in vehicle catalytic combustion. The multiple cationic species in HEOs create a diverse range of active sites, improving catalytic efficiency and durability. Additionally, the high configurational entropy enhances phase stability, preventing material degradation under electrochemical conditions. These properties make HEOs attractive candidates for use in fuel cells and metal-air batteries.

=== Supercapacitors ===
Due to their ability to accommodate multiple redox reactions, HEOs have been explored as electrode materials for supercapacitors. Their high surface area and tunable oxidation states contribute to improved capacitance and charge storage capabilities. Studies have demonstrated that HEO-based supercapacitors exhibit enhanced cycling stability compared to conventional transition metal oxides, making them suitable for high-power energy storage applications. For example, perovskite-type La(CoCrFeMnNiAl_{x})_{1/(5+x)}O_{3} and La_{0.7}Bi_{0.3}Mn_{0.4}Fe_{0.3}Cu_{0.3}O_{3} have been produced.

=== Lithium-Ion and Solid-State Batteries ===
HEOs are being investigated as potential electrode materials for lithium-ion batteries (LIBs) and solid-state batteries due to their structural robustness and ability to facilitate ion transport. Their multi-element composition enables improved electronic conductivity and ionic diffusion, which are critical for high-performance battery electrodes. Additionally, HEOs exhibit enhanced resistance to phase transitions, addressing common issues such as capacity fading and poor cycle stability in conventional battery materials.

=== Solid Oxide Fuel Cells (SOFCs) ===
HEOs have been studied as potential electrode and electrolyte materials for solid oxide fuel cells (SOFCs). Their high entropy stabilizes oxygen vacancies, improving oxygen ion conductivity and electrochemical activity at lower operating temperatures. This could lead to more efficient and durable SOFCs, reducing the reliance on expensive rare-earth elements traditionally used in these systems.

== Terminology ==
The definition of high-entropy oxide is debated. In oxide literature, the term is commonly used to refer to any oxide with at least five principal cations. However, it has been suggested that this is a misnomer, as most reports neglect to calculate configurational entropy. Additionally, a survey of 10 HEOs found that only 3 were entropy-stabilized. It has been suggested that the term HEO be replaced with three terms: compositionally complex oxide, high-entropy oxide, and entropy-stabilized oxide. In this scheme, compositionally complex refers to materials with multiple elements occupying the same sublattice, high-entropy refers to materials where configurational entropy plays a role in stabilization, and entropy-stabilized refers to materials where entropy dominates the enthalpy term and is necessary for the formation of a crystalline phase.

== See also ==
- High-entropy alloy
