= Mechanical alloying =

Mechanical alloying (MA) is a solid-state and powder processing technique involving repeated cold welding, fracturing, and re-welding of blended powder particles in a high-energy ball mill to produce a homogeneous material. Originally developed to produce oxide-dispersion strengthened (ODS) nickel- and iron-base superalloys for applications in the aerospace industry, MA has now been shown to be capable of synthesizing a variety of equilibrium and non-equilibrium alloy phases starting from blended elemental or pre-alloyed powders. The non-equilibrium phases synthesized include supersaturated solid solutions, metastable crystalline and quasicrystalline phases, nanostructures, and amorphous alloys.The method is sometimes is classified as a surface severe plastic deformation method to achieve nanomaterials.

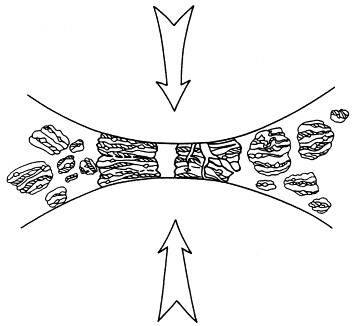
Alloying during high-energy milling.

== Metal mixes ==
Mechanical alloying is akin to metal powder processing, where metals may be mixed to produce superalloys. Mechanical alloying occurs in three steps. First, the alloy materials are combined in a ball mill and ground to a fine powder. A hot isostatic pressing (HIP) process is then applied to simultaneously compress and sinter the powder. A final heat treatment stage helps remove existing internal stresses produced during any cold compaction which may have been used. This produces an alloy suitable for high heat turbine blades and aerospace components. In combination with powder spheroidization this technology can be used to develop rapidly new alloy powders for additive manufacturing

== Design ==
Design parameters include type of mill, milling container, milling speed, milling time, type, size, and size distribution of the grinding medium, ball-to-powder weight ratio, extent of filling the vial, milling atmosphere, process control agent, temperature of milling, and the reactivity of the species.

== Process ==
The process of mechanical alloying involves the production of a composite powder particles by:

1. Using a high energy mill to favor plastic deformation required for cold welding and reduce the process times
2. Using a mixture of elemental and master alloy powders (the latter to reduce the activity of the element, since it is known that the activity in an alloy or a compound could be orders of magnitude less than in a pure metal)
3. Eliminating the use of surface-active agents which would produce fine pyrophoric powder as well as contaminate the powder
4. Relying on a constant interplay between welding and fracturing to yield a powder with a refined internal structure, typical of very fine powders normally produced, but having an overall particle size which was relatively coarse, and therefore stable.

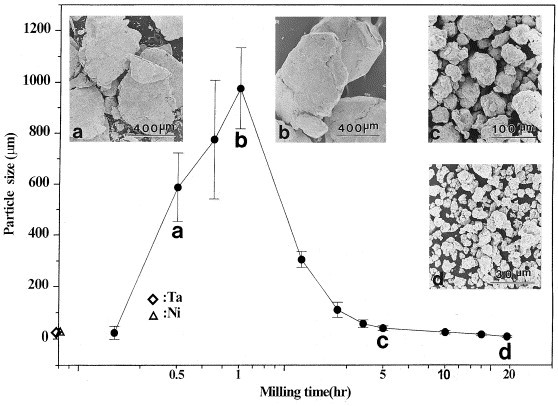
Narrow particle size distribution.

== Milling ==
During high-energy milling the powder particles are repeatedly flattened, cold welded, fractured and rewelded. Whenever two steel balls collide, some powder is trapped between them. Typically, around 1000 particles with an aggregate weight of about 0.2 mg are trapped during each collision. The force of the impact plastically deforms the powder particles, leading to work hardening and fracture. The new surfaces thus created enable the particles to weld together; this leads to an increase in particle size. Since in the early stages of milling, the particles are soft (if using either ductile-ductile or ductile-brittle material combination), their tendency to weld together and form large particles is high. A broad range of particle sizes develops, with some as large as three times larger than the starting particles. The composite particles at this stage have a characteristic layered structure consisting of various combinations of the starting constituents. With continued deformation particles become work hardened, and fracture by a fatigue failure mechanism and/or by the fragmentation of fragile flakes.
