= Jien-Wei Yeh =

Material Scientist

Jien-Wei Yeh is a professor in the Department of Materials Science and Engineering at the National Tsing Hua University, in Hsinchu, Taiwan. He is known for his contributions to the field of high-entropy alloy.

== Research on high-entropy alloys ==
Yeh first conceived the idea for high-entropy alloys in 1995. Yeh led his first research group on the subject in 2001 funded by the National Science Council of Taiwan. That research group published several papers in 2004 and a review in 2020. The early work was soon after Brian Cantor released some of his foundational work.
