= Equal channel angular extrusion =

Equal channel angular extrusion (ECAE) also called equal channel angular pressing (ECAP), is a severe plastic deformation (SPD) technique used to produce ultrafine-grained (UFG) material. The method was developed in the Soviet Union in 1973 by Segal. However, the dates are not always consistent. In industrial metalworking, it is an extrusion process. The technique refines the microstructure of metals and alloys, thereby improving their strength according to the Hall-Petch relationship. This process improves not only the strength but also other properties, such as corrosion and wear resistance, in alloys and compounds.

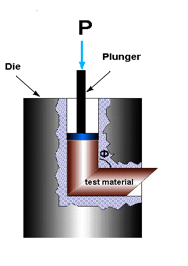
During the ECAE process, the material is pressed through an angular die and experiences shear deformation, without changing its cross-sectional dimensions.

ECAE is unique because it can achieve significant cold work without reducing the cross-sectional area of the deformed workpiece. In conventional deformation processes like rolling, forging, extrusion, and drawing, strain is introduced by reducing the cross-sectional area. ECAE produces significant deformation strain without reducing the cross-sectional area. This is accomplished by extruding the workpiece around a corner. For example, a square cross-section metal bar is forced through a channel at a 90° angle. The cross section of the channel is equal on entry and exit. The metal's complex deformation as it flows around the corner produces very high strain. Because the cross-section remains the same, a workpiece can be extruded multiple times, with each pass adding strain.

The design is critical because it requires large forces.

To reduce friction, the pushed sample is lubricated with grease, for example, a mixture of graphite and oil. To reduce the forces, the process is sometimes carried out at elevated temperatures. However, recrystallization can occur in these cases, which can also lead to excessive grain growth.

Various modifications of the process are currently being developed for scaled-up or continuous production. Incremental ECAP (I-ECAP) is an example for continuous production.

== Process routes ==
The process can be carried out in multiple passes. According to the rotation angle and direction between successive passes, there can be four fundamental process routes named A, Ba, Bc, and C:

- A - The sample is not rotated,
- Ba - the sample is rotated by 90° clockwise and counterclockwise around its longitudinal axis alternatively,
- Bc - the sample is rotated by 90° clockwise around its longitudinal axis,
- C - the sample is rotated by 180° around its longitudinal axis.

== Finite element method in the ECAE process ==
Scientists analyze the material's behavior during deformation and flow. Many articles discuss this process in computer simulations, where finite element method is one of the key approaches used for understanding deformation in the ECAE process.

== See also ==
Severe plastic deformation

Strengthening mechanisms of materials
