= Shirley Congdon =

Vice Chancellor of the University of Bradford (born 1961)

8th Vice Chancellor of the University of Bradford
- Incumbent
- Assumed office 1 August 2019
- Preceded by: Brian Cantor

Personal details
- Born: 1961 (age 63–64); Blackhall Colliery, County Durham, England
- Salary: £234,000 (2021–22)

Shirley Congdon (born 1961) is a British nurse and academic administrator who is the eighth and current vice chancellor of the University of Bradford, appointed in 2019. She has also chaired the Yorkshire Universities consortium since 2020.

== Biography ==
Congdon was born in Blackhall Colliery, County Durham, England, in 1961. She worked at Hartlepool General Hospital during secondary school, and became a nurse in 1982. She studied at Teesside University in the late 1990s, while still working as a nurse. She was the first person in her family to attend university, and later received a master's degree and teaching certificate from Durham University and the University of Bath. After completing her studies, she worked in higher education at several institutions, becoming a department head at Teesside and director of academic delivery at Liverpool John Moores University.

Congdon became the dean of health studies at the University of Bradford in 2009. She was named pro vice chancellor for learning and teaching in 2011, and deputy vice chancellor (academic) in 2015. In March 2019, the university announced that Congdon was appointed as vice chancellor, and she began her tenure on 1 August, succeeding Brian Cantor. She is the eighth person, and first woman, to hold the role of vice chancellor at the University of Bradford.

She was appointed to the Leeds City Region enterprise partnership board in March 2020. Congdon has chaired Yorkshire Universities, a consortium of twelve universities in the Yorkshire region, since August 2020. She succeeded Chris Husbands, and is the first woman in the position.

== Publications ==
- Congdon, Graham John; Congdon, Shirley (2011). "Engaging students in a simulated collaborative action research project: an evaluation of a participatory approach to learning". Journal of Further and Higher Education. 35 (2): 221–231. doi:10.1080/0309877X.2010.548597. S2CID 144353685.
- Carter, Lynne; Hedges, Lesley; Congdon, Shirley (2012). "Using Diversity Interventions to Increase Cervical Screening of Lesbian and Bisexual Women". Journal of Psychological Issues in Organizational Culture. 3 (2): 59–71. doi:10.1002/jpoc.20098.
