= Thermal shock synthesis =

Thermal shock synthesis (TSS) is a method in which materials are synthesized via rapid, high-temperature heating. In the TSS process, temperatures as high as 3000 K are applied for a duration of just seconds or milliseconds, followed by rapid cooling (a TSS image shown in Fig. 1). In this regard, TSS is distinct from conventional high-temperature syntheses that feature slow and near-equilibrium heating at limited temperature ranges (e.g., 1500 K for furnace heating) for extended periods of time (typically hours) and generally slow heating and cooling (~10 K/min).

TSS utilizes high temperature to drive reactions at extreme and non-equilibrium conditions. Additionally, the use of the ultra-high temperature can dramatically increase reaction rates for rapid material production. As a result of these characteristics, TSS is particularly applicable for the discovery of new reactions and materials and enabling rapid manufacturing.

== Realization ==
The TSS method was invented by Dr. Liangbing Hu and his team at the University of Maryland, College Park. The technology is also patented. The TSS was first realized by Joule heating of carbon materials to a high temperature and rapidly quenched with a short duration, which are controlled by electric power with a high temporal resolution. The essence of TSS is the ability to precisely control the high temperature to ensure rapid "shock" heating. Generally, the temperature, duration, and ramping rate can be independently controlled for specific heating requirements.

Since high-temperature heating is ubiquitously used for reactions and materials synthesis, innovative TSS processes have been discovered and demonstrated, including microwave, laser, rapid radiative heating, and discharge flash heating, enabling synthesis of diverse emerging materials, such as single atom and alloyed catalysts, high entropy alloy nanoparticles, nanoscale composites, battery cathodes and anodes, and high-quality graphene, etc.
