= Cantor alloys =

New multicomponent single-phase fcc alloys

Cantor alloys are a type of multicomponent high-entropy alloy. The first one discovered was the equiatomic face-centred cubic (fcc) CrMnFeCoNi alloy, which is now seen as a model high‑entropy alloy system. Cantor alloys were the first high-entropy alloys that were discovered. They were discovered by Brian Cantor and colleagues at the University of Sussex in the late 1970s and early 1980s, followed by other early studies on high‑entropy alloys by Jien‑Wei Yeh and co‑workers.

== Background ==
In conventional engineering alloys, one element is usually used as the main component, with one or more additional elements added in relatively small amounts to modify the main properties or to introduce secondary properties. In contrast, multicomponent high‑entropy alloys are made by combining several elements in relatively large concentrations. When more than three or four elements are present in relatively high concentrations, the configurational entropy of mixing can often be high enough to stabilise a single-phase solid‑solution and suppress the formation of compounds.

== The CrMnFeCoNi alloy ==
The original Cantor alloy consists of equal concentrations of chromium, manganese, iron, cobalt and nickel, i.e. it has 20 atomic per cent of each element, and it is usually written as Cr20Mn20Fe20Co20Ni20 or simply CrMnFeCoNi. The alloy was first reported by Brian Cantor and Alain Vincent in work carried out at the University of Sussex, when it was shown to form a single‑phase fcc solid solution in the as-cast condition as well as after heat treatment.

Diffraction and electron microscopy studies have since shown that the CrMnFeCoNi alloy forms a chemically disordered fcc phase over a wide temperature range, with the five elements distributed near-randomly on the fcc crystal lattice sites. Subsequent characterisation using techniques such as atom probe tomography and X‑ray or neutron diffraction have shown more accurately that the alloy is very close to an ideal random solution, with only very limited deviations from complete chemical disorder.

Because of its ease of manufacturing, simple crystal structure, and an extensive experimental database, CrMnFeCoNi is widely used as a benchmark or reference alloy in studies of high‑entropy and multicomponent alloys, and is often referred to in the literature as "the Cantor alloy".

== Cantor alloys ==
Research on related compositions has shown that there is a wide range of multicomponent compositions around CrMnFeCoNi with similar fcc solid‑solution structures, which are sometimes referred to as Cantor‑type or Cantor alloys. These include many three-, four‑, five‑, six‑ and higher‑component alloys, often made up of combinations of middle and late transition metals similar to CrMnFeCoNi, together with more limited additions of early transition metals, main‑group elements, semimetals and non‑metals.

Many such compositions exhibit single‑phase fcc microstructures with near‑random distributions of the constituent atoms over the lattice sites, but multiphase microstructures are also found, depending on the alloy composition and the processing conditions. Experimental studies, thermodynamic calculations, atomistic modelling and machine learning methods have all been used to try to identify Cantor alloys with stable fcc solid solutions.

== Atomic structure and properties ==
Atomic‑scale investigations of Cantor‑type alloys have shown a wide variety of local atomic configuration, because of the large number of ways in which different elements can be arranged within the first few coordination shells around any given atom. These variations in local nanostructure lead to corresponding variations in local lattice strain and electronic structure, which can impede electron, dislocation and vacancy motion and thus influence the mechanical and physical properties of the alloys.

Mechanical testing has shown that CrMnFeCoNi and related Cantor alloys can exhibit combinations of relatively high strength and ductility over a wide temperature range, along with notable fracture toughness and fatigue resistance. Studies of corrosion, wear and irradiation behaviour have also reported good resistance in some environments, contributing to other potential uses of Cantor alloys.

== See also ==
- High-entropy alloy
