= Brian Cantor =

British vice-chancellor and materials researcher

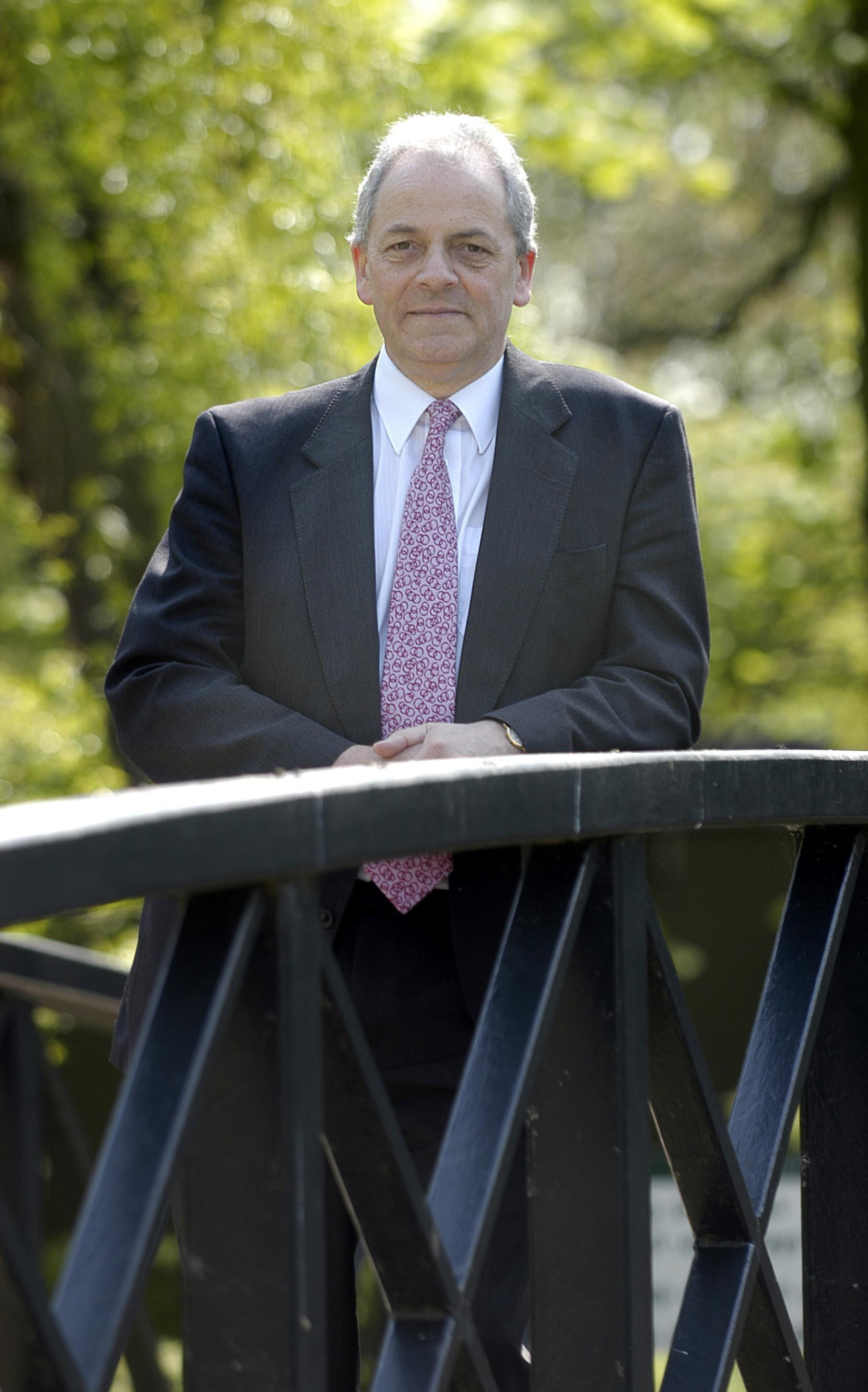
Cantor in 2009 at the University of York

Brian Cantor CBE FREng FRS (born 11 January 1948) is a British materials researcher. He has been a long-serving university leader, is a visiting professor in the Department of Materials at the University of Oxford, and a consultant at the Brunel Centre for Advanced Solidification Technology (BCAST) at Brunel University. He was the vice-chancellor of the University of Bradford from 2013 to 2019. Prior to this appointment he was the vice-chancellor at the University of York from 2002 to 2013, and previously he was the head of the Mathematical and Physical Sciences Division at the University of Oxford.

Cantor is acknowledged as a world authority on materials manufacturing and is a former vice-president of the Royal Academy of Engineering. He has published over 300 books and papers, with almost 25,000 citations and a Google h-index of 60, and is on the ISI List of Most Cited Researchers. He invented the field of high-entropy alloys and discovered the so-called "Cantor alloys". He founded the Begbroke Science Park at Oxford, and the Heslington East Campus at York. He has chaired and been on the board of many organisations, including the National Science Learning Centre, the Science Museums Group, the Marshall Aid Commission, the UK Universities Pensions Forum, the Worldwide Universities Network, and the World Technology Universities Congress. He has received academic prizes, honorary professorships and fellowships in the UK, US, China and India.

== Biography ==
Cantor studied at Manchester Grammar School and Christ's College, Cambridge.

He has worked at universities including Sussex, Oxford, York, Washington State and Banaras Hindu University (BHU), and for companies including Alcan, Elsevier, General Electric and Rolls-Royce. He has advised organisations such as EPSRC, NASA, the EU and the Dutch, Spanish and German governments. He chaired international review panels for the Institute of Metal Research (IMR), Shenyang, China, the Department of Materials Engineering at the Indian Institute of Sciences (IISc), Bangalore, and the Institute of Innovative Materials, Wollongong University, Australia. He was a member of the Sainsbury review of UK science and innovation.

He has chaired and been on the board of many companies and agencies, including the Kobe Institute, the UK Universities Pensions Forum, the White Rose University Consortium, Yorkshire Innovation, Leeds, York and Bradford Economic Partnerships, the Chambers of Commerce, the National Science Learning Centre, the Centre for Low Carbon Futures, Science City York, the Worldwide Universities Network, the UK College of Business and Computing, The Marshall Aid Commemoration Commission and the Science Museum Group. He founded the Begbroke Science Park at Oxford, the National Science Learning Centre, the Hull-York Medical School, and the World Technology Universities Network (WTUN), and led the £1bn Heslington East campus development at York.

Cantor was appointed Commander of the Order of the British Empire (CBE) in the 2013 New Year Honours for services to higher education.

== Research ==
Cantor's research has investigated the manufacture of materials and has contributed to fundamental scientific advances as well as improvements in many industrial products. He is well known for inventing the field of high entropy alloys, and discovering the so-called "Cantor alloys". He has supervised over 130 research students and postdocs, published over 300 papers and books, given over 100 invited talks in more than 15 countries, received almost 25,000 citations with an h-index of 60, and is on the list of ISI List of Most Cited Researchers. He was awarded the Rosenhain and Platinum Medals of the Institute of Materials, Minerals and Mining.

Cantor is an Honorary Professor at Shenyang, Zhejiang and Nanjing Universities, the National Institute of Metals in China and the Indian Institute of Sciences, an Honorary Member of the Indian Institute of Metals, a Member of Academia Europaea, and a Fellow of the Institute of Materials, Minerals and Mining, the Institute of Physics, the Chartered Management Institute and the Royal Academy of Engineering. He is a member of the Scientific Council at the IMDEA Materials Institute in Madrid.

In 2024, Cantor was elected a Fellow of the Royal Society.

Academic offices
Preceded by Mark Cleary	Vice-Chancellor of the University of Bradford; 2013–2019	Succeeded by Shirley Congdon
Preceded by Sir Ron Cooke	Vice-Chancellor, University of York; 2002–2013	Succeeded by Koen Lamberts
