= Ball mill =

Machine used to grind or blend materials

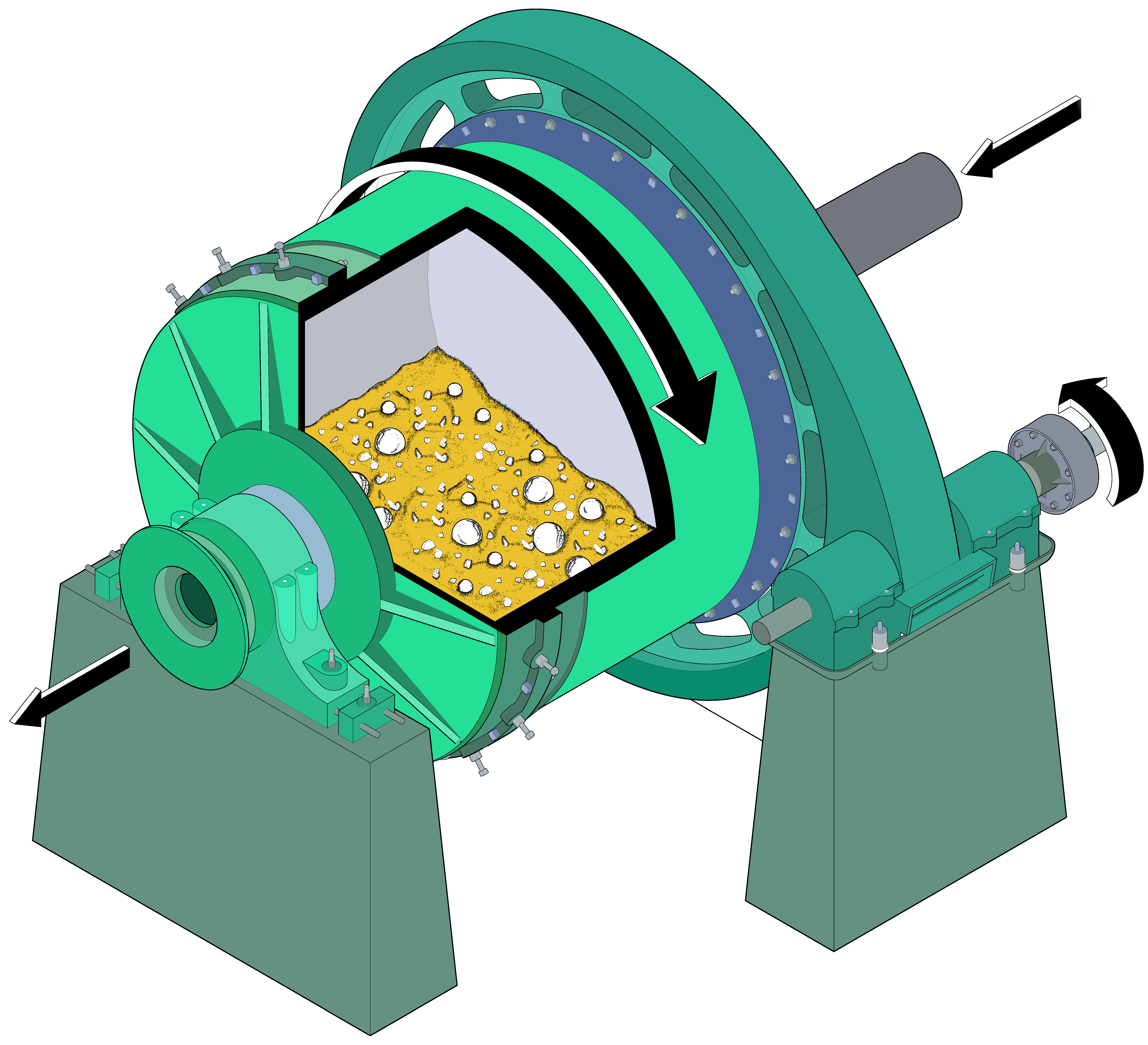
A section cut-through of ball mills

A ball mill is a type of grinder filled with grinding balls, used to grind or blend materials for use in mineral dressing processes, paints, pyrotechnics, ceramics, and selective laser sintering. It works on the principle of impact and attrition: size reduction is done by impact as the balls drop from near the top of the shell.

A ball mill consists of a hollow cylindrical shell rotating about its axis. The axis of the shell may be either horizontal or at a small angle to the horizontal. It is partially filled with balls. The grinding media are the balls, which may be made of steel (chrome steel), stainless steel, ceramic, or rubber. The inner surface of the cylindrical shell is usually lined with an abrasion-resistant material such as manganese steel or rubber lining. Less wear takes place in rubber lined mills. The length of the mill is approximately equal to its diameter.

The general idea behind the ball mill is an ancient one, but it was not until the Industrial Revolution and the invention of steam power that an effective ball milling machine could be built. It is reported to have been used for grinding flint for pottery in 1870.

== Working ==
Operations of ball mill

In case of continuously operated ball mill, the material to be ground is fed from the left through a 60° cone and the product is discharged through a 30° cone to the right. As the shell rotates, the balls are lifted up on the rising side of the shell and then they cascade down (or drop down on to the feed), from near the top of the shell. In doing so, the solid particles in between the balls and ground are reduced in size by impact.

== Applications ==
Ball mills are used for grinding materials such as mining ores, coal, pigments, and feldspar for pottery. Grinding can be carried out wet or dry, but the former is performed at low speed. Ball mills are used often in scientific work to reduce the particle size, eliminate agglomeration, change the shape of particles, provide for mechanical alloying, mixing, producing powders and changing materials properties. An open source ball mill has been designed that can be fabricated with a 3D printer for a few hundred dollars. It is able to be operated both on grid for lab work and off grid with solar photovoltaics and a battery for field work. Blending of explosives is an example of an application for rubber balls. For systems with multiple components, ball milling has been shown to be effective in increasing solid-state chemical reactivity. Additionally, ball milling has been shown effective for production of amorphous materials. It may also be useful to separate gases such as hydrogen and store them in powder form.

== Description ==
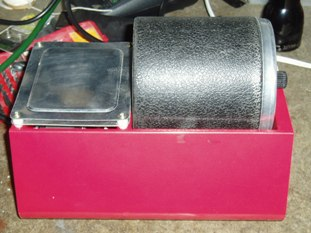
Benchtop ball mill

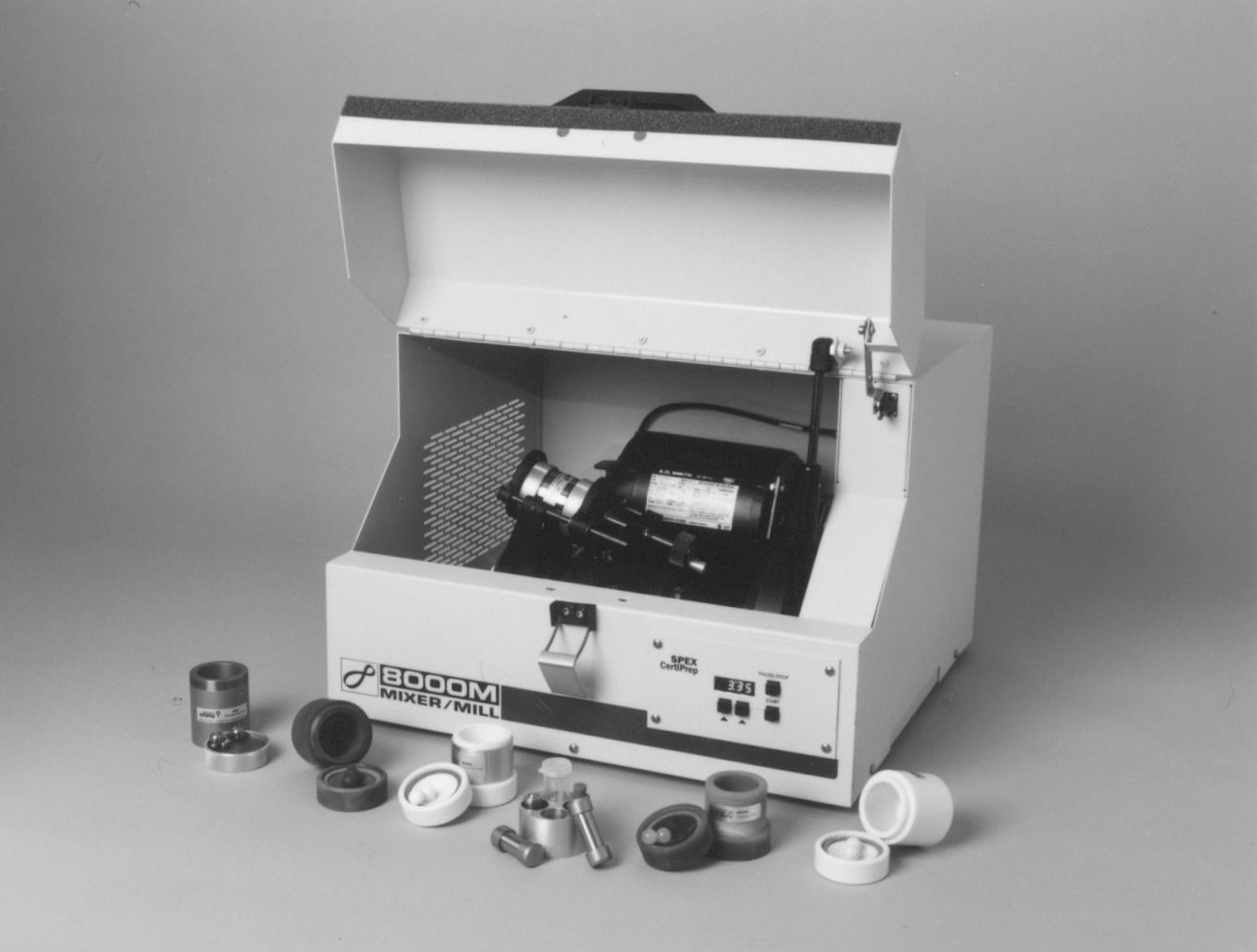
Laboratory scale ball mill

High-energy ball milling

A ball mill, a type of grinder, is a cylindrical device used in grinding (or mixing) materials like ores, chemicals, ceramic raw materials and paints. Ball mills rotate around a horizontal axis, partially filled with the material to be ground plus the grinding medium. Different materials are used as media, including ceramic balls, flint pebbles, and stainless steel balls. An internal cascading effect reduces the material to a fine powder. Industrial ball mills can operate continuously, fed at one end and discharged at the other end. Large to medium-sized ball mills are mechanically rotated on their axis, but small ones normally consist of a cylindrical capped container that sits on two drive shafts (pulleys and belts are used to transmit rotary motion). A rock tumbler functions on the same principle. Ball mills are also used in pyrotechnics and the manufacture of black powder, but cannot be used in the preparation of some pyrotechnic mixtures such as flash powder because of their sensitivity to impact. High-quality ball mills are potentially expensive and can grind mixture particles to as small as 5 nm, enormously increasing surface area and reaction rates.

The grinding works on the principle of critical speed. Critical speed can be understood as that speed after which the steel balls that are responsible for the grinding of particles start rotating along the direction of the cylindrical device, thus causing no further grinding.

Ball mills are used extensively in the mechanical alloying process, in which they are used for grinding and for cold welding, producing alloys from powders.

The ball mill is a key piece of equipment for grinding crushed materials, and it is widely used in production lines for powders such as cement, silicates, refractory material, fertilizer, glass ceramics, etc., as well as for ore dressing of ferrous and non-ferrous metals. The ball mill can grind ores and other materials, wet or dry. There are two kinds of ball mills according to their ways of discharging material: grate type, and overfall type. Many types of grinding media are suitable for use in a ball mill, each material having its own specific properties and advantages. Key properties of grinding media are size, density, hardness, and composition.

- Size: The smaller the media particles, the smaller the particle size of the final product. The grinding media particles should be substantially larger than the largest pieces of material to be ground.
- Density: The media should be denser than the material being ground. It becomes a problem if the grinding media floats on top of the material to be ground.
- Hardness: The grinding media needs to be durable enough to grind the material, but, where possible, not so tough that it also wears down the tumbler.
- Composition: Various grinding applications have special requirements. Some of these requirements are based on some of the grinding media being in the finished product, while others are based on how the media will react with the material being ground.
- Where the color of the finished product is important, the color and material of the grinding media must be considered.
- Where low contamination is important, the grinding media may be selected for ease of separation from the finished product (e.g., steel dust produced from stainless steel media can be magnetically separated from non-ferrous products). An alternative to separation is to use media of the same material as the product being ground.
- Flammable products have a tendency to become explosive in powder form. Steel media may spark, becoming an ignition source for these products. Either wet-grinding, or non-sparking media such as ceramic or lead must be selected.
- Some media, such as iron, may react with corrosive materials. For this reason, stainless steel, ceramic, and flint grinding media may each be used when corrosive substances are present during grinding.

The grinding chamber can also be filled with an inert shield gas that does not react with the material being ground, to prevent oxidation or explosive reactions that could occur with ambient air inside the mill.

== Advantages of the ball mill ==
Ball milling boasts several advantages over other systems: the cost of installation and grinding medium is low; the capacity and fineness can be adjusted by adjusting the diameter of the ball; it is suitable for both batch and continuous operation; it is suitable for open and closed-circuit grinding; it is applicable for materials of all degrees of hardness.

== Varieties ==
Aside from common ball mills, there is a second type of ball mill called a planetary ball mill. Planetary ball mills are smaller than common ball mills and mainly used in laboratories for grinding sample material down to very small sizes. A planetary ball mill consists of one or more grinding jar (representing “planet”) which are attached eccentrically on a circular platform, called sun wheel or revolution disk. The revolution direction of the sun wheel is opposite to that of the grinding jars rotation about their own axis (at their fixed locations on the revolution disk). The grinding balls in the grinding jars are subjected to superimposed rotational movements (centrifugal forces) and coriolis forces. The difference in speeds between the balls and grinding jars produces an interaction between frictional and impact forces, which releases high dynamic energies. The interplay between these forces produces the high and very effective degree of size reduction of the planetary ball mill.

An optimum rotation-to-revolution speed ratio and the grinding jar's rotational direction counter to the revolution disk is important for achieving high impact energy and grinding rate. The rotation-to-revolution speed ratio (RRSR) are calculated using discrete element method (DEM) taking into account the type and properties of raw materials and the several interaction forces such as the normal, tangential, compressive and total forces. For most applications including colloidal milling, this ratio is 1:-2, which means during one revolution of sun wheel, the grinding jar undergoes two rotations (in opposite direction). Higher speed ratios of 1:-2.5 or 1:-3 are mainly used for mechanochemical applications.

== See also ==
- Hammer mill
- Cement mill
- Tumble finishing
- Vertical roller mill
