= Superalloy =

Alloy with higher durability than normal metals

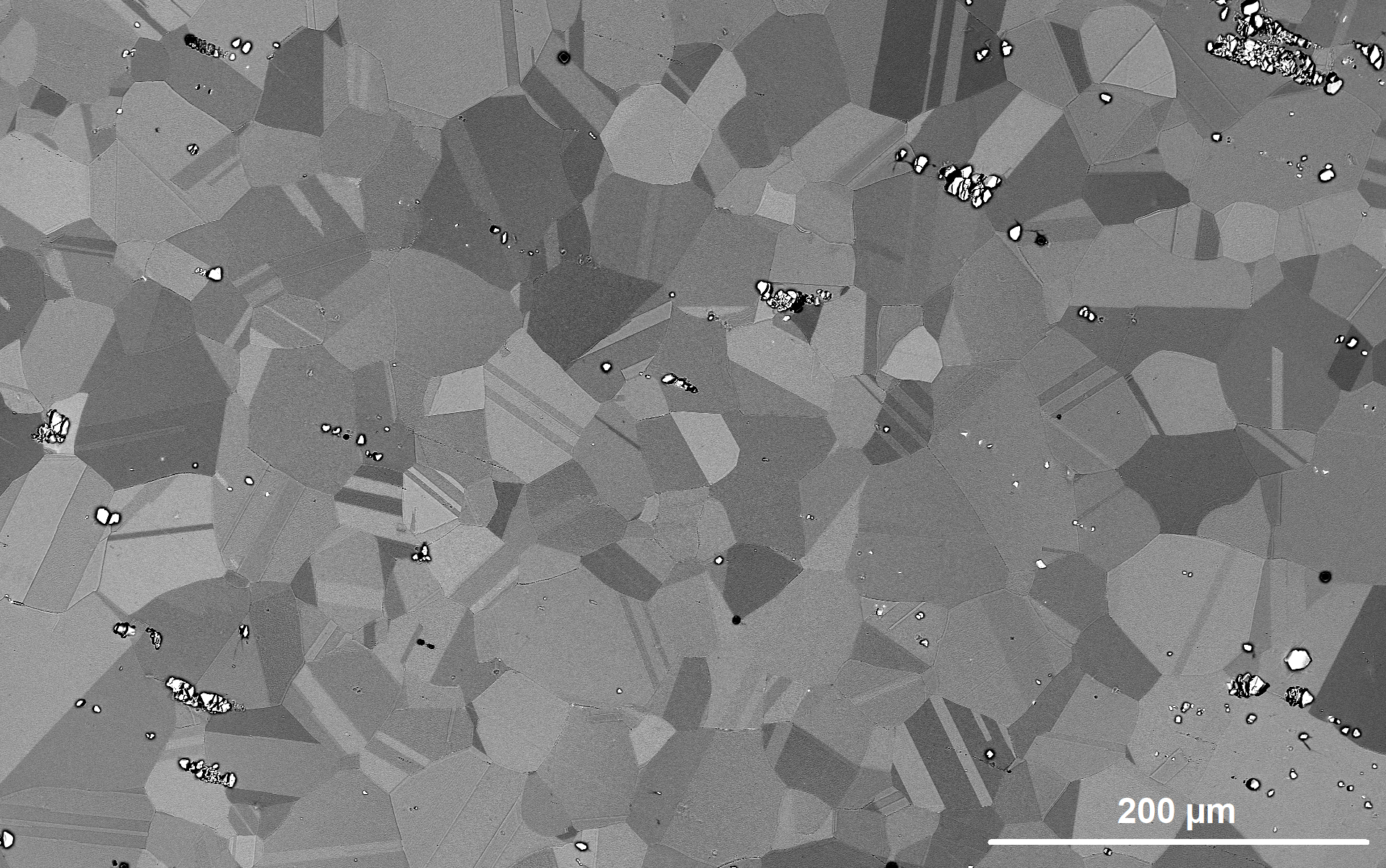
Grain structure of Ni-based superalloy Inconel 718

A superalloy, sometimes called a heat-resistant superalloy (HRSA) or a high-performance alloy, is an alloy with the ability to operate at a high fraction of its melting point. Key characteristics of a superalloy include mechanical strength, thermal creep deformation resistance, surface stability, and corrosion and oxidation resistance.

The crystal structure is typically face-centered cubic (FCC) austenitic. Examples of such alloys are Hastelloy, Inconel, Waspaloy, Rene alloys, Incoloy, MP98T, TMS alloys, and CMSX single crystal alloys. They are broadly grouped into three families: nickel-based, cobalt-based, and iron-based.

Superalloy development relies on chemical and process innovations. Superalloys develop high temperature strength through solid solution strengthening and precipitation strengthening from secondary phase precipitates such as gamma prime and carbides. Oxidation or corrosion resistance is provided by elements such as aluminium and chromium. Superalloys are often cast as a single crystal in order to eliminate grain boundaries, trading in strength at low temperatures for increased resistance to thermal creep.

The primary application for such alloys is in aerospace and marine turbine engines. Creep is typically the lifetime-limiting factor in gas turbine blades.

Superalloys have opened up new processes in very-high-temperature engineering.

== Chemical development ==
Because these alloys are intended for high temperature applications their creep and oxidation resistance are of primary importance. Nickel (Ni)-based superalloys are the material of choice for these applications because of their unique γ' precipitates. The properties of these superalloys can be tailored to a certain extent through the addition of various other elements, common or exotic, including not only metals, but also metalloids and nonmetals; chromium, iron, cobalt, molybdenum, tungsten, tantalum, aluminium, titanium, zirconium, niobium, rhenium, yttrium, vanadium, carbon, boron or hafnium are some examples of the alloying additions used. Each addition serves a particular purpose in optimizing properties.

Creep resistance is dependent, in part, on slowing the speed of dislocation motion within a crystal structure. In modern Ni-based superalloys, the γ'-Ni_{3}(Al,Ti) phase acts as a barrier to dislocation. For this reason, this γ' intermetallic phase, when present in high volume fractions, increases the strength of these alloys due to its ordered nature and high coherency with the γ matrix. The chemical additions of aluminum and titanium promote the creation of the γ' phase. The γ' phase size can be precisely controlled by careful precipitation strengthening heat treatments. Many superalloys are produced using a two-phase heat treatment that creates a dispersion of cuboidal γ' particles known as the primary phase, with a fine dispersion between these known as secondary γ'. In order to improve the oxidation resistance of these alloys, Al, Cr, B, and Y are added. The Al and Cr form oxide layers that passivate the surface and protect the superalloy from further oxidation while B and Y are used to improve the adhesion of this oxide scale to the substrate. Cr, Fe, Co, Mo and Re all preferentially partition to the γ matrix while Al, Ti, Nb, Ta, and V preferentially partition to the γ' precipitates and solid solution strengthen the matrix and precipitates respectively. In addition to solid solution strengthening, if grain boundaries are present, certain elements are chosen for grain boundary strengthening. B and Zr tend to segregate to the grain boundaries which reduces the grain boundary energy and results in better grain boundary cohesion and ductility. Another form of grain boundary strengthening is achieved through the addition of C and a carbide former, such as Cr, Mo, W, Nb, Ta, Ti, or Hf, which drives precipitation of carbides at grain boundaries and thereby reduces grain boundary sliding.

Ni-based superalloy compositions
Element	Composition range (weight %)	Purpose
Ni, Fe, Co	50-70%	These elements form the base matrix γ phase of the superalloy. Ni is necessary because it also forms γ' (Ni_{3}Al). Fe and Co have higher melting points than Ni and offer solid solution strengthening. Fe is also much cheaper than Ni or Co.
Cr	5-20%	Cr is necessary for oxidation and corrosion resistance; it forms a protective oxide Cr_{2}O_{3}.
Al	0.5-6%	Al is the main γ' former. It also forms a protective oxide Al_{2}O_{3}, which provides oxidation resistance at higher temperature than Cr_{2}O_{3}.
Ti	1-4%	Ti forms γ'.
C	0.05-0.2%	MC and M_{23}C_{6} (M = metal) carbides are the strengthening phase in the absence of γ'.
B,Zr	0-0.1%	Boron and zirconium provide strength to grain boundaries. This is not essential in single-crystal turbine blades, because there are no grain boundaries.
Nb	0-5%	Nb can form γ'', a strengthening phase at lower (below 700 °C) temperatures.
Re, W, Hf, Mo, Ta	1-10%	Refractory metals, added in small amounts for solid solution strengthening (and carbide formation). They are heavy, but have extremely high melting points.

=== Phase formation ===
Adding elements is usually helpful because of solid solution strengthening, but can result in unwanted precipitation. Precipitates can be classified as geometrically close-packed (GCP), topologically close-packed (TCP), or carbides. GCP phases usually benefit mechanical properties, but TCP phases are often deleterious. Because TCP phases are not truly close packed, they have few slip systems and are brittle. Also they "scavenge" elements from GCP phases. Many elements that are good for forming γ' or have great solid solution strengthening may precipitate TCPs. The proper balance promotes GCPs while avoiding TCPs.

TCP phase formation areas are weak because they:

- have inherently poor mechanical properties
- are incoherent with the γ matrix
- are surrounded by a "depletion zone" where there is no γ'
- usually form sharp plate or needle-like morphologies which nucleate cracks

The main GCP phase is γ'. Almost all superalloys are Ni-based because of this phase. γ' is an ordered L1_{2} (pronounced L-one-two), which means it has a certain atom on the face of the unit cell, and a certain atom on the corners of the unit cell. Ni-based superalloys usually present Ni on the faces and Ti or Al on the corners.

Another "good" GCP phase is γ''. It is also coherent with γ, but it dissolves at high temperatures.

Superalloy phases
Phase	Classification	Structure	Composition(s)	Appearance	Effect
γ	matrix	disordered FCC	Ni, Co, Fe and other elements in solid solution	The background for other precipitates	The matrix phase, provides ductility and a structure for precipitates
γ'	GCP	L1_{2} (ordered FCC)	Ni_{3}(Al,Ti)	cubes, rounded cubes, spheres, or platelets (depending on lattice mismatch)	The main strengthening phase. γ' is coherent with γ, which allows for ductility.
Carbide	Carbide	FCC	mC, m_{23}C_{6}, and m_{6}C (m = metal)	string-like clumps, like strings of pearls	There are many carbides, but they all provide dispersion strengthening and grain boundary stabilization.
γ''	GCP	D0_{22} (ordered BCT)	Ni_{3}Nb	very small disks	This precipitate is coherent with γ'. It is the main strengthening phase in IN-718, but γ'' dissolves at high temperatures.
η	GCP	D0_{24} (ordered HCP)	Ni_{3}Ti	may form cellular or Widmanstätten patterns	The phase is not the worst, but it is not as good as γ'. It can be useful in controlling grain boundaries.
δ	not close-packed	orthorhombic	Ni_{3}Nb	acicular (needle-like)	The main issue with this phase is that it's not coherent with γ, but it is not inherently weak. It typically forms from decomposing γ'', but sometimes it's intentionally added in small amounts for grain boundary refinement.
σ	TCP	tetrahedral	FeCr, FeCrMo, CrCo	elongated globules	This TCP is usually considered to have the worst mechanical properties. It is never desirable for mechanical properties.
μ	TCP	hexagonal	Fe_{2}Nb, Co_{2}Ti, Fe_{2}Ti	globules or platelets	This phase has typical TCP issues. It is never desirable for mechanical properties.
Laves	TCP	rhombohedral	(Fe,Co)_{7}(Mo,W)_{6}	coarse Widmanstätten platelets	This phase has typical TCP issues. It is never desirable for mechanical properties.

== Families of superalloys ==
=== Ni-based ===
==== History ====
The United States became interested in gas turbine development around 1905. From 1910 to 1915, austenitic (γ phase) stainless steels were developed to survive high temperatures in gas turbines. By 1929, 80Ni-20Cr alloy was the norm, with small additions of Ti and Al. Although early metallurgists did not know it yet, they were forming small γ' precipitates in Ni-based superalloys. These alloys quickly surpassed Fe- and Co-based superalloys, which were strengthened by carbides and solid solution strengthening.

Although Cr was great for protecting the alloys from oxidation and corrosion up to 700 °C, metallurgists began decreasing Cr in favor of Al, which had oxidation resistance at much higher temperatures. The lack of Cr caused issues with hot corrosion, so coatings needed to be developed.

Around 1950, vacuum melting became commercialized, which allowed metallurgists to create higher purity alloys with more precise composition.

In the 60s and 70s, metallurgists changed focus from alloy chemistry to alloy processing. Directional solidification was developed to allow columnar or even single-crystal turbine blades. Oxide dispersion strengthening could obtain very fine grains and superplasticity.

==== Phases ====
- Gamma (γ): This phase composes the matrix of Ni-based superalloy. It is a solid solution fcc austenitic phase of the alloying elements. The alloying elements most found in commercial Ni-based alloys are, C, Cr, Mo, W, Nb, Fe, Ti, Al, V, and Ta. During the formation of these materials, as they cool from the melt, carbides precipitate, and at even lower temperatures γ' phase precipitates.
- Gamma prime (γ'): This phase constitutes the precipitate used to strengthen the alloy. It is an intermetallic phase based on Ni_{3}(Ti,Al) which have an ordered FCC L1_{2} structure. The γ' phase is coherent with the matrix of the superalloy having a lattice parameter that varies by around 0.5%. Ni_{3}(Ti,Al) are ordered systems with Ni atoms at the cube faces and either Al or Ti atoms at the cube edges. As particles of γ' precipitates aggregate, they decrease their energy states by aligning along the <100> directions forming cuboidal structures. This phase has a window of instability between 600 °C and 850 °C, inside of which γ' will transform into the HCP η phase. For applications at temperatures below 650 °C, the γ" phase can be utilized for strengthening.

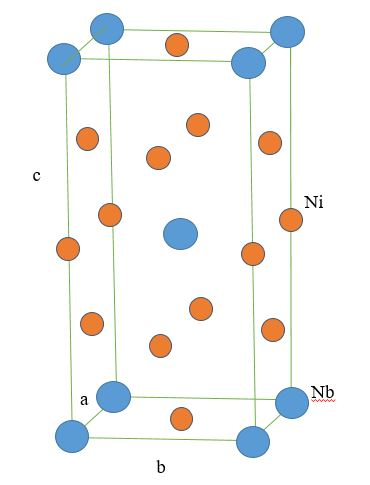
Crystal structure for γ" (Ni_{3}Nb) (Body Centered Tetragonal)

- Gamma double prime (γ"): This phase typically is Ni_{3}Nb or Ni_{3}V and is used to strengthen Ni-based superalloys at lower temperatures (<650 °C) relative to γ'. The crystal structure of γ" is body-centered tetragonal (BCT), and the phase precipitates as 60 nm by 10 nm discs with the (001) planes in γ" parallel to the {001} family in γ. These anisotropic discs form as a result of lattice mismatch between the BCT precipitate and the FCC matrix. This lattice mismatch leads to high coherency strains which, together with order hardening, are the primary strengthening mechanisms. The γ" phase is unstable above approximately 650 °C.
- Carbide phases: Carbide formation is usually deleterious although in Ni-based superalloys they are used to stabilize the structure of the material against deformation at high temperatures. Carbides form at the grain boundaries, inhibiting grain boundary motion.
- Topologically close-packed (TCP) phases: The term "TCP phase" refers to any member of a family of phases (including the σ phase, the χ phase, the μ phase, and the Laves phase), which are not atomically close-packed but possess some close-packed planes with HCP stacking. TCP phases tend to be highly brittle and deplete the γ matrix of strengthening, solid solution refractory elements (including Cr, Co, W, and Mo). These phases form as a result of kinetics after long periods of time (thousands of hours) at high temperatures (>750 °C).

=== Co-based ===
Co-based superalloys depend on carbide precipitation and solid solution strengthening for mechanical properties. While these strengthening mechanisms are inferior to gamma prime (γ') precipitation strengthening, cobalt has a higher melting point than nickel and has superior hot corrosion resistance and thermal fatigue. As a result, carbide-strengthened Co-based superalloys are used in lower stress, higher temperature applications such as stationary vanes in gas turbines.

Co's γ/γ' microstructure was rediscovered and published in 2006 by Sato et al. That γ' phase was Co_{3}(Al, W). Mo, Ti, Nb, V, and Ta partition to the γ' phase, while Fe, Mn, and Cr partition to the matrix γ.

The next family of Co-based superalloys was discovered in 2015 by Makineni et al. This family has a similar γ/γ' microstructure, but is W-free and has a γ' phase of Co_{3}(Al,Mo,Nb). Since W is heavy, its elimination makes Co-based alloys increasingly viable in turbines for aircraft, where low density is especially valued.

The most recently discovered family of superalloys was computationally predicted by Nyshadham et al. in 2017, and demonstrated by Reyes Tirado et al. in 2018. This γ' phase is W free and has the composition Co_{3}(Nb,V) and Co_{3}(Ta,V).

==== Phases ====
- Gamma (γ): This is the matrix phase. While Co-based superalloys are less-used commercially, alloying elements include C, Cr, W, Ni, Ti, Al, Ir, and Ta. As in stainless steels, Chromium is used (occasionally up to 20 wt.%) to improve resistance to oxidation and corrosion via the formation of a Cr_{2}O_{3} passive layer, which is critical for use in gas turbines, but also provides solid-solution strengthening due to the mismatch in the atomic radii of Co and Cr, and precipitation hardening due to the formation of MC-type carbides.
- Gamma Prime (γ'): Constitutes the precipitate used to strengthen the alloy. It is usually close-packed with a L1_{2} structure of Co_{3}Ti or FCC Co_{3}Ta, though both W and Al integrate into these cuboidal precipitates. Ta, Nb, and Ti integrate into the γ' phase and are stabilize it at high temperatures.
- Carbide Phases: Carbides strengthen the alloy through precipitation hardening but decrease low-temperature ductility.
- Topologically Close-Packed (TCP) phases may appear in some Co-based superalloys, but embrittle the alloy and are thus undesirable.

=== Fe-based ===
Steel superalloys are of interest because some present creep and oxidation resistance similar to Ni-based superalloys, at far less cost.

Gamma (γ): Fe-based alloys feature a matrix phase of austenite iron (FCC). Alloying elements include: Al, B, C, Co, Cr, Mo, Ni, Nb, Si, Ti, W, and Y. Al (oxidation benefits) must be kept at low weight fractions (wt.%) because Al stabilizes a ferritic (BCC) primary phase matrix, which is undesirable, as it is inferior to the high temperature strength exhibited by an austenitic (FCC) primary phase matrix.

Gamma-prime (γ'): This phase is introduced as precipitates to strengthen the alloy. γ'-Ni_{3}Al precipitates can be introduced with the proper balance of Al, Ni, Nb, and Ti additions.

==== Microstructure ====
The two major types of austenitic stainless steels are characterized by the oxide layer that forms on the steel surface: either chromia-forming or alumina-forming. Cr-forming stainless steel is the most common type. However, Cr-forming steels do not exhibit high creep resistance at high temperatures, especially in environments with water vapor. Exposure to water vapor at high temperatures can increase internal oxidation in Cr-forming alloys and rapid formation of volatile Cr (oxy)hydroxides, both of which can reduce durability and lifetime.

Al-forming austenitic stainless steels feature a single-phase matrix of austenite iron (FCC) with an Al-oxide at the surface of the steel. Al is more thermodynamically stable in oxygen than Cr. More commonly, however, precipitate phases are introduced to increase strength and creep resistance. In Al-forming steels, NiAl precipitates are introduced to act as Al reservoirs to maintain the protective alumina layer. In addition, Nb and Cr additions help form and stabilize Al by increasing precipitate volume fractions of NiAl.

At least 5 grades of alumina-forming austenitic (AFA) alloys, with different operating temperatures at oxidation in air + 10% water vapor have been realized:

- AFA Grade: (50-60)Fe-(20-25)Ni-(14-15)Cr-(2.5-3.5)Al-(1-3)Nb wt.% base
  - 750-800 °C operating temperatures at oxidation in air + 10% water vapor
- Low Nickel AFA Grade: 63Fe-12Ni-14Cr-2.5Al-0.6Nb-5Mn3Cu wt.% base
  - 650 °C operating temperatures at oxidation in air + 10% water vapor
- High Performance AFA Grade: (45-55)Fe-(25-30)Ni-(14-15)Cr(3.5-4.5)Al-(1-3)Nb-(0.02-0.1)Hf/Y wt.% base
  - 850-900 °C operating temperatures at oxidation in air + 10% water vapor
- Cast AFA Grade: (35-50)Fe-(25-35)Ni-14Cr-(3.5-4)Al-1Nb wt.% base
  - 750-1100 °C operating temperatures at oxidation in air + 10% water vapor, depending upon Ni wt.%
- AFA superalloy (40-50)Fe-(30-35)Ni-(14-19)Cr-(2.5-3.5)Al-3Nb
  - 750-850 °C operating temperatures at oxidation in air + 10% water vapor

Operating temperatures with oxidation in air and no water vapor are expected to be higher. In addition, an AFA superalloy grade exhibits creep strength approaching that of nickel alloy UNS N06617.

== Microstructure ==
In pure Ni_{3}Al phase Al atoms are placed at the vertices of the cubic cell and form sublattice A. Ni atoms are located at centers of the faces and form sublattice B. The phase is not strictly stoichiometric. An excess of vacancies in one of the sublattices may exist, which leads to deviations from stoichiometry. Sublattices A and B of the γ' phase can solute a considerable proportion of other elements. The alloying elements are dissolved in the γ phase. The γ' phase hardens the alloy through the yield strength anomaly. Dislocations dissociate in the γ' phase, leading to the formation of an anti-phase boundary.

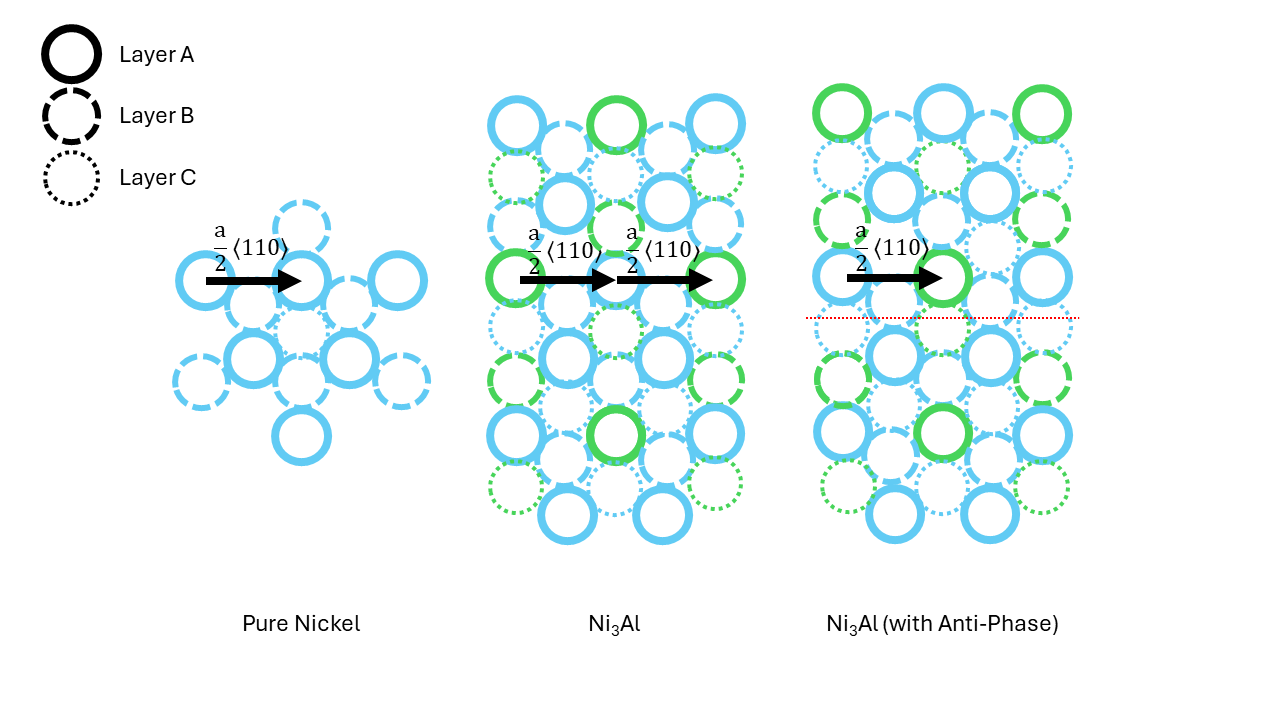
Viewed from a <111> direction, this is the effect of a dislocation along <110> passing through the respective structures. Note how the APB swaps the order of the supercell of alternating nickel and aluminum atoms above the boundary.

To give an example, consider a dislocation with a burgers vector of $\frac{a}{2}\left [ 1 \bar{1} 0 \right ]$ traveling along a $\left \{ 1 1 1 \right \}$ slip plane initially in the γ phase, where it is a perfect dislocation in that FCC structure. Since the γ' phase is primitive cubic instead of FCC due to the substitution of aluminum into the vertices of the unit cell, the perfect burgers vector along that direction in γ' is twice that of γ. For the $\frac{a}{2}\left [ 1 \bar{1} 0 \right ]$ dislocation to enter the γ' phase, it will have to create a high energy anti-phase boundary, which will need another such dislocation along the plane to restore order (as the sum of the two dislocations would have the perfect $a \left [ 1 \bar{1} 0 \right ]$ burgers vector).

It is thus rather energy prohibitive for the dislocation to enter the γ' phase unless there are two of them in close proximity along the same plane. However, the Peach-Koehler force between identical dislocations along the same plane is repulsive, which makes this a less favorable configuration. One possible mechanism involves one of the dislocations being pinned against the γ' phase while the other dislocation in the γ phase cross-slips into close proximity of the pinned dislocation from another plane, allowing the pair of dislocations to push into the γ' phase.

Furthermore, the burgers vector $\frac{a}{2}\left \langle 110 \right \rangle$ family of dislocations are likely to decompose into partial dislocations in this alloy due to its low stacking fault energy, such as dislocations with burgers vector of the $\frac{a}{6}\left \langle 211 \right \rangle$ family (Shockley partial dislocations). The stacking faults between these partial dislocations can further provide another obstacle to the movement of other dislocations, further contributing to the strength of the material. There are also more slip systems that can be involved beyond the $\left \{ 1 1 1 \right \}$ slip plane and $\left \langle 110 \right \rangle$ slip direction.

At elevated temperature, the free energy associated with the anti-phase boundary (APB) is considerably reduced if it lies on a particular plane, which by coincidence is not a permitted slip plane. One set of partial dislocations bounding the APB cross-slips so that the APB lies on the low-energy plane, and, since this low-energy plane is not a permitted slip plane, the dissociated dislocation is effectively locked. By this mechanism, the yield strength of γ' phase Ni_{3}Al increases with temperature up to about 1000 °C.

Initial material selection for blade applications in gas turbine engines included alloys like the Nimonic series alloys in the 1940s. The early Nimonic series incorporated γ' Ni_{3}(Al,Ti) precipitates in a γ matrix, as well as various metal-carbon carbides (e.g. Cr_{23}C_{6}) at the grain boundaries for additional grain boundary strength. Turbine blade components were forged until vacuum induction casting technologies were introduced in the 1950s. This process significantly improved cleanliness, reduced defects, and increased the strength and temperature capability.

Modern superalloys were developed in the 1980s. First generation superalloys incorporated increased Al, Ti, Ta, and Nb content in order to increase the γ' volume fraction. Examples include: PWA1480, René N4 and SRR99. Additionally, the volume fraction of the γ' precipitates increased to about 50–70% with the advent of monocrystal solidification techniques that enable grain boundaries to be eliminated. Because the material contains no grain boundaries, carbides are unnecessary as grain boundary strengthers and were thus eliminated.

Second and third generation superalloys introduce about 3 and 6 weight percent rhenium, for increased temperature capability. Re is a slow diffuser and typically partitions the γ matrix, decreasing the rate of diffusion (and thereby high temperature creep) and improving high temperature performance and increasing service temperatures by 30 °C and 60 °C in second and third generation superalloys, respectively. Re promotes the formation of rafts of the γ' phase (as opposed to cuboidal precipitates). The presence of rafts can decrease creep rate in the power-law regime (controlled by dislocation climb), but can also potentially increase the creep rate if the dominant mechanism is particle shearing. Re tends to promote the formation of brittle TCP phases, which has led to the strategy of reducing Co, W, Mo, and particularly Cr. Later generations of Ni-based superalloys significantly reduced Cr content for this reason, however with the reduction in Cr comes a reduction in oxidation resistance. Advanced coating techniques offset the loss of oxidation resistance accompanying the decreased Cr contents. Examples of second generation superalloys include PWA1484, CMSX-4 and René N5.

Third generation alloys include CMSX-10, and René N6. Fourth, fifth, and sixth generation superalloys incorporate ruthenium additions, making them more expensive than prior Re-containing alloys. The effect of Ru on the promotion of TCP phases is not well-determined. Early reports claimed that Ru decreased the supersaturation of Re in the matrix and thereby diminished the susceptibility to TCP phase formation. Later studies noted an opposite effect. Chen, et al., found that in two alloys differing significantly only in Ru content (USTB-F3 and USTB-F6) that the addition of Ru increased both the partitioning ratio as well as supersaturation in the γ matrix of Cr and Re, and thereby promoted the formation of TCP phases.

The current trend is to avoid very expensive and very heavy elements. An example is Eglin steel, a budget material with compromised temperature range and chemical resistance. It does not contain rhenium or ruthenium and its nickel content is limited. To reduce fabrication costs, it was chemically designed to melt in a ladle (though with improved properties in a vacuum crucible). Conventional welding and casting is possible before heat-treatment. The original purpose was to produce high-performance, inexpensive bomb casings, but the material has proven widely applicable to structural applications, including armor.

== Single-crystal superalloys ==
Single-crystal superalloys (SX or SC superalloys) are formed as a single crystal using a modified version of the directional solidification technique, leaving no grain boundaries. The mechanical properties of most other alloys depend on the presence of grain boundaries, but at high temperatures, they participate in creep and require other mechanisms. In many such alloys, islands of an ordered intermetallic phase sit in a matrix of disordered phase, all with the same crystal lattice. This approximates the dislocation-pinning behavior of grain boundaries, without introducing any amorphous solid into the structure.

Single crystal (SX) superalloys have wide application in the high-pressure turbine section of aero- and industrial gas turbine engines due to the unique combination of properties and performance. Since introduction of single crystal casting technology, SX alloy development has focused on increased temperature capability, and major improvements in alloy performance are associated with rhenium (Re) and ruthenium (Ru).

The creep deformation behavior of superalloy single crystal is strongly temperature-, stress-, orientation- and alloy-dependent. For a single-crystal superalloy, three modes of creep deformation occur under regimes of different temperature and stress: rafting, tertiary, and primary. At low temperature (~750 °C), SX alloys exhibits mostly primary creep behavior. Matan et al. concluded that the extent of primary creep deformation depends strongly on the angle between the tensile axis and the <001>/<011> symmetry boundary. At temperatures above 850 °C, tertiary creep dominates and promotes strain softening behavior. When temperature exceeds 1000 °C, the rafting effect is prevalent where cubic particles transform into flat shapes under tensile stress. The rafts form perpendicular to the tensile axis, since γ phase is transported out of the vertical channels and into the horizontal ones. Reed et al. studied unaxial creep deformation of <001> oriented CMSX-4 single crystal superalloy at 1105 °C and 100 MPa. They reported that rafting is beneficial to creep life since it delays evolution of creep strain. In addition, rafting occurs quickly and suppresses the accumulation of creep strain until a critical strain is reached.

== Oxidation ==
For superalloys operating at high temperatures and exposed to corrosive environments, oxidation behavior is a concern. Oxidation involves chemical reactions of the alloying elements with oxygen to form new oxide phases, generally at the alloy surface. If unmitigated, oxidation can degrade the alloy over time in a variety of ways, including:

- sequential surface oxidation, cracking, and spalling, eroding the alloy over time
- surface embrittlement through the introduction of oxide phases, promoting crack formation and fatigue failure
- depletion of key alloying elements, affecting mechanical properties and possibly compromising performance

Selective oxidation is the primary strategy used to limit these deleterious processes. The ratio of alloying elements promotes formation of a specific oxide phase that then acts as a barrier to further oxidation. Most commonly, aluminum and chromium are used in this role, because they form relatively thin and continuous oxide layers of alumina (Al_{2}O_{3}) and chromia (Cr_{2}O_{3}), respectively. They offer low oxygen diffusivities, effectively halting further oxidation beneath this layer. In the ideal case, oxidation proceeds through two stages. First, transient oxidation involves the conversion of various elements, especially the majority elements (e.g., nickel or cobalt). Transient oxidation proceeds until the selective oxidation of the sacrificial element forms a complete barrier layer.

The protective effect of selective oxidation can be undermined. The continuity of the oxide layer can be compromised by mechanical disruption due to stress or may be disrupted as a result of oxidation kinetics (e.g., if oxygen diffuses too quickly). If the layer is not continuous, its effectiveness as a diffusion barrier to oxygen is compromised. The stability of the oxide layer is strongly influenced by the presence of other minority elements. For example, the addition of boron, silicon, and yttrium to superalloys promotes oxide layer adhesion, reducing spalling and maintaining continuity.

Oxidation is the most basic form of chemical degradation superalloys may experience. More complex corrosion processes are common when operating environments include salts and sulfur compounds, or under chemical conditions that change dramatically over time. These issues are also often addressed through comparable coatings.

== Creep ==
One of the main strengths of superalloys are their superior creep resistant properties when compared to most conventional alloys. To start, 𝛾'-strengthened superalloys have the benefit of requiring dislocations to move in pairs due to the phase creating a high antiphase boundary (APB) energy during dislocation motion. This high APB energy makes it so that a second dislocation has to undo the APB energy created by the first. In doing so, this significantly reduces the mobility of dislocations in the material which should inhibit dislocation activated creep. These dislocation pairs (also called superdislocations) have been described as being either weakly or strongly coupled, the spacing between the dislocations compared to the size of the particle diameter being the determining factor between weak and strong. A weakly coupled dislocation has a relatively large spacing between the dislocations compared to the particle diameter while a strongly coupled dislocation has a relatively comparable spacing compared to the particle diameter. This is determined not by the dislocation spacing, but by the size of the 𝛾' particles. A weakly coupled dislocation occurs when the particle size is relatively small while a strongly coupled dislocation occurs when the particle size is relatively large (such as when a superalloy has been aged for too long). Weakly coupled dislocations exhibit pinning and bowing of the dislocation line on the 𝛾'-particles. Strongly coupled dislocation behavior depends greatly on the dislocation line lengths and the resistances benefits they offer disappear once the particle size becomes large enough.

Additionally, superalloys exhibit comparatively superior high temperature creep resistance due to thermally activated cross-slip of dislocations. When one of the dislocations in the pair cross-slips into another plane, the dislocations become pinned since they can no longer move as a pair. This pinning reduces the ability for the dislocations to move in dislocation activated creep and improving the creep resistant properties of the material.

Increasing the lattice misfit between 𝛾/𝛾' has also been shown to be beneficial for creep resistance. This is primarily since a high lattice misfit between the two phases results in a higher barrier to dislocation motion than a low lattice misfit.

For Ni-based single-crystal superalloys, upwards of ten different kinds of alloying additions can be seen to improve creep-resistance and overall mechanical properties. Alloying elements include Cr, Co, Al, Mo, W, Ti, Ta, Re, and Ru. Elements such as Co, Re, and Ru have been described to improve creep resistance by facilitating the formation of stacking faults by reducing the stacking fault energy. Increasing number of stacking faults leading to the inhibition of dislocation motion. Other elements (Al, Ti, Ta) can favorably partition into and improve the nucleation of 𝛾'-phase.

Diffusion is also a method of creep, and there are a few ways to limit diffusional creep. One primary way that superalloys can limit diffusional creep is by manipulating grain structure to reduce grain boundaries which tend to be pathways for easy diffusion. Typically this is done by manufacturing the superalloys as single crystals oriented parallel to the direction of the applied force.

== Processing ==
Superalloys were originally iron-based and cold wrought prior to the 1940s when investment casting of cobalt base alloys significantly raised operating temperatures. The 1950s development of vacuum melting allowed for fine control of the chemical composition of superalloys and reduction in contamination and in turn led to a revolution in processing techniques such as directional solidification of alloys and single crystal superalloys.

Processing methods vary widely depending on the required properties of each item.

=== Casting and forging ===
Casting and forging are traditional metallurgical processing techniques that can be used to generate both polycrystalline and monocrystalline products. Polycrystalline casts offer higher fracture resistance, while monocrystalline casts offer higher creep resistance.

Jet turbine engines employ both crystalline component types to take advantage of their individual strengths. The disks of the high-pressure turbine, which are near the central hub of the engine are polycrystalline. The turbine blades, which extend radially into the engine housing, experience a much greater centripetal force, necessitating creep resistance, typically adopting monocrystalline or polycrystalline with a preferred crystal orientation.

==== Investment casting ====
Investment casting is a metallurgical processing technique in which a wax form is fabricated and used as a template for a ceramic mold. A ceramic mold is poured around the wax form and solidifies, the wax form is melted out of the ceramic mold, and molten metal is poured into the void left by the wax. This leads to a metal form in the same shape as the original wax form. Investment casting leads to a polycrystalline final product, as nucleation and growth of crystal grains occurs at numerous locations throughout the solid matrix. Generally, the polycrystalline product has no preferred grain orientation.

==== Directional solidification ====
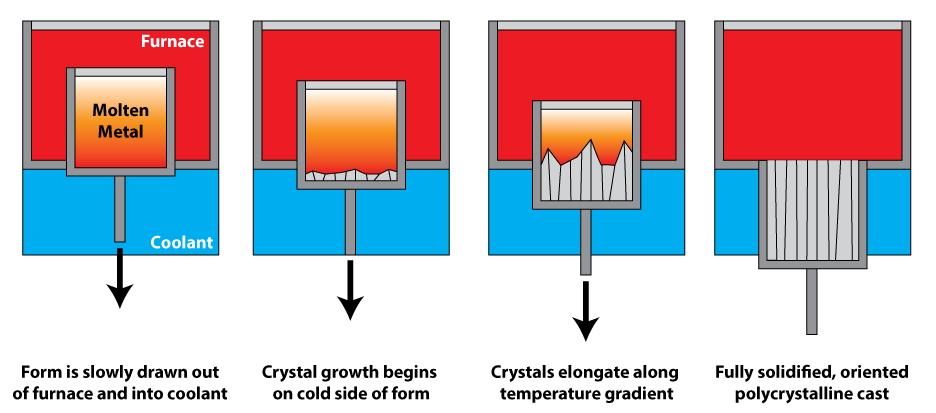
Schematic of directional solidification

Directional solidification uses a thermal gradient to promote nucleation of metal grains on a low temperature surface, as well as to promote their growth along the temperature gradient. This leads to grains elongated along the temperature gradient, and significantly greater creep resistance parallel to the long grain direction. In polycrystalline turbine blades, directional solidification is used to orient the grains parallel to the centripetal force. It is also known as dendritic solidification.

==== Single crystal growth ====
Single crystal growth starts with a seed crystal that is used to template growth of a larger crystal. The overall process is lengthy, and machining is necessary after the single crystal is grown.

=== Powder metallurgy ===
Powder metallurgy is a class of modern processing techniques in which metals are first powdered, and then formed into the desired shape by heating below the melting point. This is in contrast to casting, which occurs with molten metal. Superalloy manufacturing often employs powder metallurgy because of its material efficiency - typically much less waste metal must be machined away from the final product—and its ability to facilitate mechanical alloying. The powders used in PM superalloy processing are predominantly produced by vacuum induction melting inert gas atomization (VIGA), the dominant technique for large-scale superalloy powder production. Mechanical alloying is a process by which reinforcing particles are incorporated into the superalloy matrix material by repeated fracture and welding. Powder metallurgy combined with hot isostatic pressing (PM-HIP) provides a near-net-shape processing route for nickel-based superalloys that avoids the chemical segregation and coarse grain structures typical of cast ingots. Gas-atomized powder is encapsulated and consolidated under high temperature and pressure, producing components with fine, homogeneous microstructures. The fatigue behaviour of PM-HIPed superalloys is influenced by prior particle boundaries (PPBs), which can act as preferential sites for crack initiation if not properly controlled through powder handling and HIP cycle optimisation.

=== Additive manufacturing ===
Laser powder bed fusion of γ′-strengthened nickel-based superalloys such as IN738LC, IN939 and CM247LC is complicated by their high susceptibility to cracking. These alloys are often described as "non-weldable" because their high γ′ volume fraction promotes several cracking mechanisms during processing: solidification cracking (hot tearing) in the melt pool, strain-age cracking during post-process heat treatment, and liquation cracking in the heat-affected zone. A review of laser powder bed fusion of γ′-strengthened superalloys found that cracking tendency is governed by the interplay of alloy chemistry, solidification conditions and residual stress, with crack-free processing generally requiring tight control of process parameters and, in many cases, alloy composition modification. Direct energy deposition (DED) and laser cladding are also used to repair worn or cracked superalloy turbine components, such as high-pressure turbine blades, by depositing superalloy powder onto the damaged region; laser powder cladding has been applied to restore eroded blade tips and edge cracks, extending service life at lower cost than component replacement.

==== Sintering and hot isostatic pressing ====
Sintering and hot isostatic pressing are processing techniques used to densify materials from a loosely packed "green body" into a solid object with physically merged grains. Sintering occurs below the melting point, and causes adjacent particles to merge at their boundaries, creating a strong bond between them. In hot isostatic pressing, a sintered material is placed in a pressure vessel and compressed from all directions (isostatically) in an inert atmosphere to affect densification.

==== Additive manufacturing ====
Selective laser melting (also known as powder bed fusion) is an additive manufacturing procedure used to create intricately detailed forms from a CAD file. A shape is designed and then converted into slices. These slices are sent to a laser writer to print the final product. In brief, a bed of metal powder is prepared, and a slice is formed in the powder bed by a high energy laser sintering the particles together. The powder bed moves downwards, and a new batch of metal powder is rolled over the top. This layer is then sintered with the laser, and the process is repeated until all slices have been processed. Additive manufacturing can leave pores behind. Many products undergo a heat treatment or hot isostatic pressing procedure to densify the product and reduce porosity.

== Coatings ==
In modern gas turbines, the turbine entry temperature (~1750 K) exceeds superalloy incipient melting temperature (~1600 K), with the help of surface engineering.

=== Types ===
The three types of coatings are: diffusion coatings, overlay coatings, and thermal barrier coatings. Diffusion coatings, mainly constituted with aluminide or platinum-aluminide, is the most common. MCrAlX-based overlay coatings (M=Ni or Co, X=Y, Hf, Si) enhance resistance to corrosion and oxidation. Compared to diffusion coatings, overlay coatings are more expensive, but less dependent on substrate composition, since they must be carried out by air or vacuum plasma spraying (APS/VPS) or electron beam physical vapour deposition (EB-PVD). Thermal barrier coatings provide by far the best enhancement in working temperature and coating life. It is estimated that modern TBC of thickness 300 μm, if used in conjunction with a hollow component and cooling air, has the potential to lower metal surface temperatures by a few hundred degrees.

==== Thermal barrier coatings ====
Thermal barrier coatings (TBCs) are used extensively in gas turbine engines to increase component life and engine performance. A coating of about 1-200 μm can reduce the temperature at the superalloy surface by up to 200 K. TBCs are a system of coatings consisting of a bond coat, a thermally grown oxide (TGO), and a thermally insulating ceramic top coat. In most applications, the bond coat is either a MCrAlY (where M=Ni or NiCo) or a Pt modified aluminide coating. A dense bond coat is required to provide protection of the superalloy substrate from oxidation and hot corrosion attack and to form an adherent, slow-growing surface TGO. The TGO is formed by oxidation of the aluminum that is contained in the bond coat. The current (first generation) thermal insulation layer is composed of 7wt % yttria-stabilized zirconia (7YSZ) with a typical thickness of 100–300 μm. Yttria-stabilized zirconia is used due to its low thermal conductivity (2.6W/mK for fully dense material), relatively high coefficient of thermal expansion, and high temperature stability. The electron beam-directed vapor deposition (EB-DVD) process used to apply the TBC to turbine airfoils produces a columnar microstructure with multiple porosity levels. Inter-column porosity is critical to providing strain tolerance (via a low in-plane modulus), as it would otherwise spall on thermal cycling due to thermal expansion mismatch with the superalloy substrate. This porosity reduces the thermal coating's conductivity.

==== Bond coat ====
The bond coat adheres the thermal barrier to the substrate. Additionally, the bond coat provides oxidation protection and functions as a diffusion barrier against the motion of substrate atoms towards the environment. The five major types of bond coats are: the aluminides, the platinum-aluminides, MCrAlY, cobalt-cermets, and nickel-chromium. For aluminide bond coatings, the coating's final composition and structure depends on the substrate composition. Aluminides lack ductility below 750 °C, and exhibit limited thermomechanical fatigue strength. Pt-aluminides are similar to the aluminide bond coats except for a layer of Pt (5—10 μm) deposited on the blade. The Pt aids in oxide adhesion and contributes to hot corrosion, increasing blade lifespan. MCrAlY does not strongly interact with the substrate. Normally applied by plasma spraying, MCrAlY coatings from secondary aluminum oxides. This means that the coatings form an outer chromia layer and a secondary alumina layer underneath. These oxide formations occur at high temperatures in the range of those that superalloys usually encounter. The chromia provides oxidation and hot-corrosion resistance. The alumina controls oxidation mechanisms by limiting oxide growth by self-passivating. The yttrium enhances oxide adherence to the substrate, and limits the growth of grain boundaries (which can lead to coat flaking). Addition of rhenium and tantalum increases oxidation resistance. Cobalt-cermet-based coatings consisting of materials such as tungsten carbide/cobalt can be used due to excellent resistance to abrasion, corrosion, erosion, and heat. These cermet coatings perform well in situations where temperature and oxidation damage are significant concerns, such as boilers. One of cobalt cermet's unique advantages is minimal loss of coating mass over time, due to the strength of carbides. Overall, cermet coatings are useful in situations where mechanical demands are equal to chemical demands. Nickel-chromium coatings are used most frequently in boilers fed by fossil fuels, electric furnaces, and waste incineration furnaces, where the danger of oxidizing agents and corrosive compounds in the vapor must be addressed. The specific method of spray-coating depends on the coating composition. Nickel-chromium coatings that also contain iron or aluminum provide better corrosion resistance when they are sprayed and laser glazed, while pure nickel-chromium coatings perform better when thermally sprayed exclusively.

=== Process methods ===
Several kinds of coating process are available: pack cementation process, gas phase coating (both are a type of chemical vapor deposition (CVD)), thermal spraying, and physical vapor deposition. In most cases, after the coating process, near-surface regions of parts are enriched with aluminium in a matrix of the nickel aluminide.

==== Pack cementation ====
Pack cementation is a widely used CVD technique that consists of immersing the components to be coated in a metal powder mixture and ammonium halide activators and sealing them in a retort. The entire apparatus is placed inside a furnace and heated in a protective atmosphere to a lower than normal temperature that allows diffusion, due to the halide salts chemical reaction that causes a eutectic bond between the two metals. The surface alloy that is formed due to thermal-diffused ion migration has a metallurgical bond to the substrate and an intermetallic layer found in the gamma layer of the surface alloys.

The traditional pack consists of four components at temperatures below (750 °C):

- Substrate or parts
- Ferrous and non-ferrous powdered alloy: (Ti and/or Al, Si and/or Zn, B and/ or Cr)
- Halide salt activator: Ammonium halide salts
- Relatively inert filler powder (Al_{2}O_{3}, SiO_{2}, or SiC)

This process includes:

- Aluminizing
- Chromizing
- Siliconizing
- Sherardizing
- Boronizing
- Titaniumizing

Pack cementation has reemerged when combined with other chemical processes to lower the temperatures of metal combinations and give intermetallic properties to different alloy combinations for surface treatments.

==== Thermal spraying ====
Thermal spraying involves heating a feedstock of precursor material and spraying it on a surface. Specific techniques depend on desired particle size, coat thickness, spray speed, desired area, etc. Thermal spraying relies on adhesion to the surface. As a result, the surface of the superalloy must be cleaned and prepared, and usually polished, before application.

===== Plasma spraying =====
Plasma spraying offers versatility of usable coatings, and high-temperature performance. Plasma spraying can accommodate a wide range of materials, versus other techniques. As long as the difference between melting and decomposition temperatures is greater than 300 K, plasma spraying is viable.

==== Gas phase ====
Gas phase coating is carried out at higher temperatures, about 1080 °C. The coating material is usually loaded onto trays without physical contact with the parts to be coated. The coating mixture contains active coating material and activator, but usually not thermal ballast. As in the pack cementation process, gaseous aluminium chloride (or fluoride) is transferred to the surface of the part. However, in this case the diffusion is outwards. This kind of coating also requires diffusion heat treatment.

==== Failure mechanisms ====
Failure of thermal barrier coating usually manifests as delamination, which arises from the temperature gradient during thermal cycling between ambient temperature and working conditions coupled with the difference in thermal expansion coefficient of substrate and coating. It is rare for the coating to fail completely – some pieces remain intact, and significant scatter is observed in the time to failure if testing is repeated under identical conditions. Various degradation mechanisms affect thermal barrier coating, and some or all of these must operate before failure finally occurs:

- Oxidation at the interface of thermal barrier coating and underlying bond coat;
- Depletion of aluminum in bond coat due to oxidation and diffusion with substrate;
- Thermal stresses from mismatch in thermal expansion coefficient and growth stress due to the formation of thermally grown oxide layer;
- Imperfections near thermally grown oxide layer;
- Various other complicating factors during engine operation.

Additionally, TBC life is sensitive to the combination of materials (substrate, bond coat, ceramic) and processes (EB-PVD, plasma spraying) used.

== Applications ==
=== Turbines ===
Nickel-based superalloys are used in load-bearing structures requiring the highest homologous temperature of any common alloy system (Tm = 0.9, or 90% of their melting point). Among the most demanding applications for a structural material are those in the hot sections of turbine engines (e.g. turbine blade). They comprise over 50% of the weight of advanced aircraft engines. The widespread use of superalloys in turbine engines coupled with the fact that the thermodynamic efficiency of turbine engines is a function of increasing turbine inlet temperatures has provided part of the motivation for increasing the maximum-use temperature of superalloys. From 1990 to 2020, turbine airfoil temperature capability increased on average by about 2.2 °C/year. Two major factors have made this increase possible:

- Processing techniques that improved alloy cleanliness (thus improving reliability) and/or enabled the production of tailored microstructures such as directionally solidified or single-crystal material.
- Alloy development resulting in higher temperature materials primarily through the additions of refractory elements such as Re, W, Ta, and Mo.

About 60% of the temperature increases related to advanced cooling, while 40% have resulted from material improvements. State-of-the-art turbine blade surface temperatures approach 1,150 C. The most severe stress and temperature combinations correspond to an average bulk metal temperature approaching 1,000 C.

Although Ni-based superalloys retain significant strength to 980 C, they tend to be susceptible to environmental attack because of the presence of reactive alloying elements. Surface attack includes oxidation, hot corrosion, and thermal fatigue.

=== Energy production ===
High temperature materials are valuable for energy conversion and energy production applications. Maximum energy conversion efficiency is desired in such applications, in accord with the Carnot cycle. Because Carnot efficiency is limited by the temperature difference between the hot and cold reservoirs, higher operating temperatures increase energy conversion efficiency. Operating temperatures are limited by superalloys, limiting applications to around 1000 °C-1400 °C. Energy applications include:

- Solar thermal power plants (stainless steel rods containing heated water)
- Steam turbines (turbine blades and boiler housing)
- Heat exchangers for nuclear reactor systems

Alumina-forming stainless steel is weldable and has potential for use in automotive applications, such as for high temperature exhaust piping and in heat capture and reuse.

== Research ==
=== Radiolysis ===
Sandia National Laboratories is studying radiolysis for making superalloys. It uses nanoparticle synthesis to create alloys and superalloys. This process holds promise as a universal method of nanoparticle formation. By developing an understanding of the basic material science, it might be possible to expand research into other aspects of superalloys. Radiolysis produces polycrystalline alloys, which suffer from an unacceptable level of creep.

=== Austenitic steel ===
Stainless steel alloys remain a research target because of lower production costs, as well as the need for an austenitic stainless steel with high-temperature corrosion resistance in environments with water vapor. Research focuses on increasing high-temperature tensile strength, toughness, and creep resistance to compete with Ni-based superalloys.

Oak Ridge National Laboratory is researching austenitic alloys, achieving similar creep and corrosion resistance at 800 °C to that of other austenitic alloys, including Ni-based superalloys.

=== AFA superalloys ===
Development of AFA superalloys with a 35 wt.% Ni-base have shown potential for use in operating temperatures upwards to 1,100 °C.

=== Multi-principal-element superalloy (MPES) ===
Researchers at Sandia Labs, Ames National Laboratory and Iowa State University reported a 3D-printed superalloy composed of 42% aluminum, 25% titanium, 13% niobium, 8% zirconium, 8% molybdenum and 4% tantalum. Most alloys are made chiefly of one primary element, combined with low amounts of other elements. In contrast MPES have substantial amounts of three or more elements.

Such alloys promise improvements on high-temperature applications, strength-to-weight, fracture toughness, corrosion and radiation resistance, wear resistance, and others. They reported ratio of hardness and density of 1.8–2.6 GPa-cm^{3}/g, which surpasses all known alloys, including intermetallic compounds, titanium aluminides, refractory MPEAs, and conventional Ni-based superalloys. This represents a 300% improvement over Inconel 718 based on measured peak hardness of 4.5 GPa and density of 8.2 g/cm^{3}, (0.55 GPa-cm^{3}/g).

The material is stable at 800 °C, hotter than the 570+ °C found in typical coal-based power plants.

The researchers acknowledged that the 3D printing process produces microscopic cracks when forming large parts, and that the feedstock includes metals that limit applicability in cost-sensitive applications.

== See also ==
- Oxide dispersion strengthened alloy
- Titanium aluminide
