= TI3 =

TI3 may refer to:

- The International 2013, a Dota 2 tournament
- Twilight Imperium: Third Edition, a 2005 board game
- Ti3, a component of Titanium aluminide
