= Turbine blade =

Aerofoil; individual component of a turbine disc

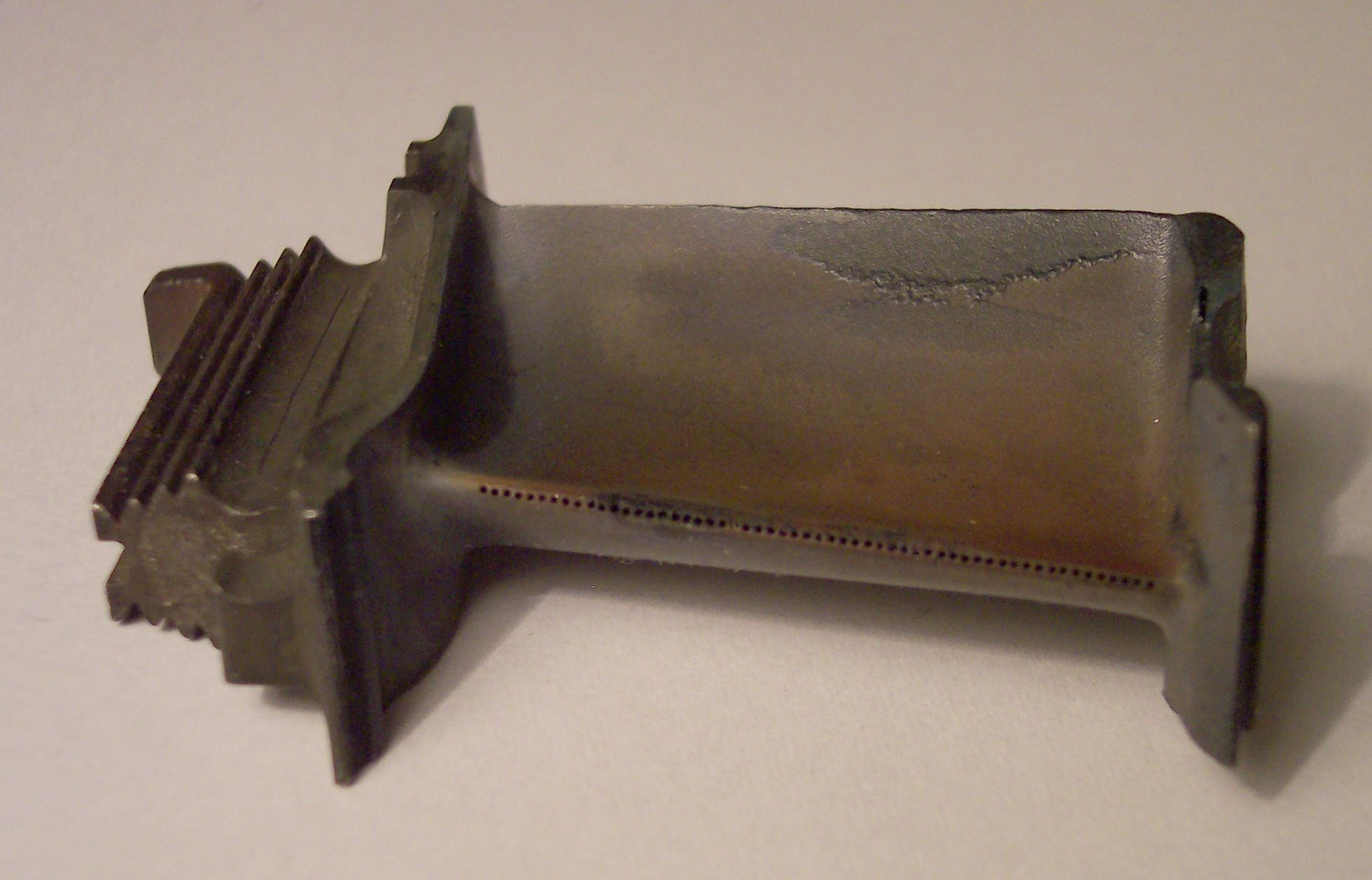
Turbine blade from a Turbo-Union RB199 jet engine. This is a blade with an outer shroud which prevents gas leaking round the blade tip in which case it wouldn't contribute to the force on the aerofoil. The platform at the base of the aerofoil forms a continuous annulus ring which, together with cooling-air cavity purge flow prevents hot gas leakage onto the turbine discs. The short extension, or shank, between the platform and fir-tree fixing in the disc allows space for cooling-air entry to blade, may control blade vibration modes and heat transfer to disc rim.

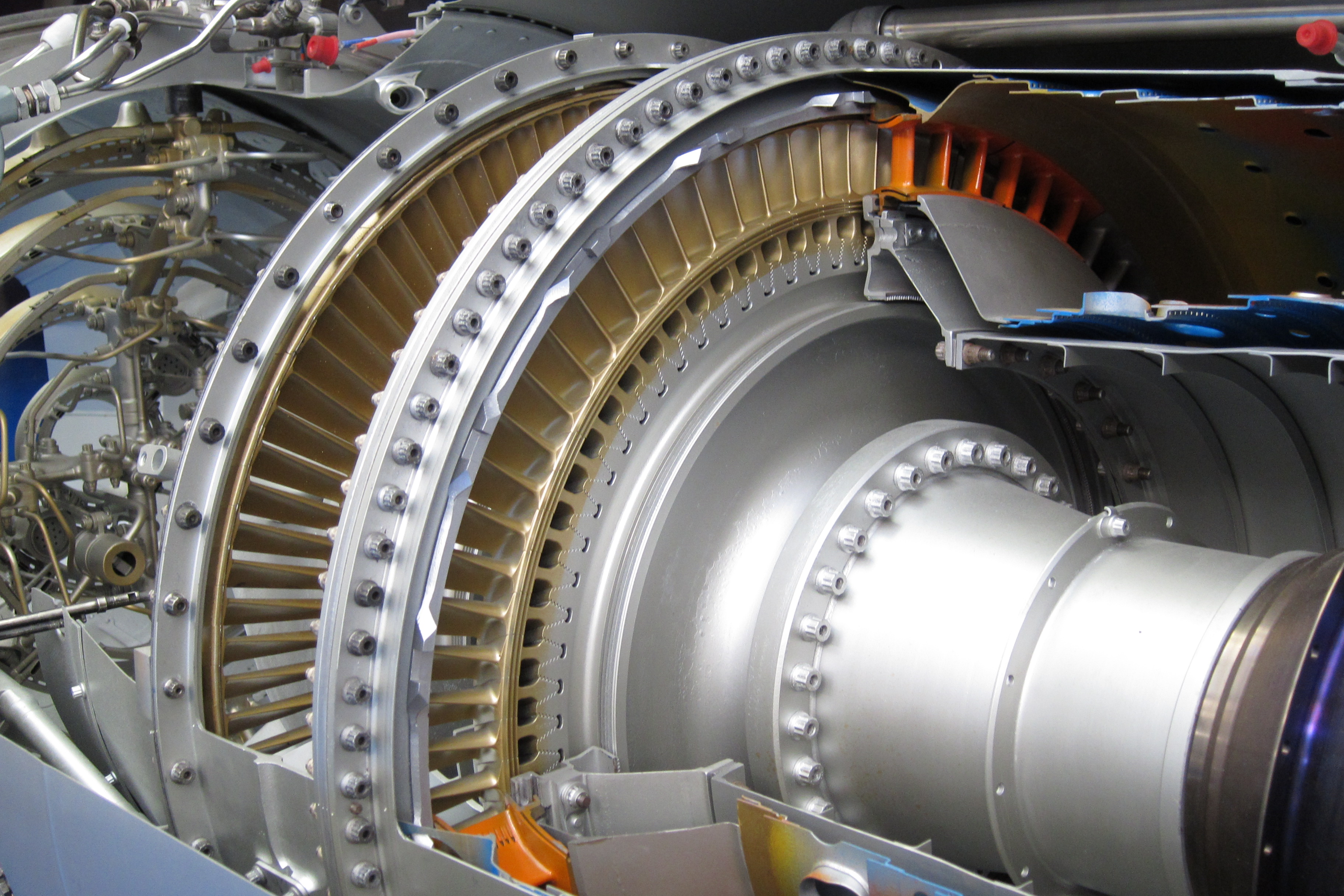
The turbine blades have a golden colour in this engine cutaway.

A turbine blade is a radial aerofoil mounted in the rim of a turbine disc and which produces a tangential force which rotates a turbine rotor. Each turbine disc has many blades. As such they are used in gas turbine engines and steam turbines. The blades are responsible for extracting energy from the high temperature, high pressure gas produced by the combustor. The turbine blades are often the limiting component of gas turbines. To survive in this difficult environment, turbine blades often use exotic materials like superalloys and many different methods of cooling that can be categorized as internal and external cooling, and thermal barrier coatings. Blade fatigue is a major source of failure in steam turbines and gas turbines. Fatigue is caused by the stress induced by vibration and resonance within the operating range of machinery. To protect blades from these high dynamic stresses, friction dampers are used.

Blades of wind turbines and water turbines are designed to operate in different conditions, which typically involve lower rotational speeds and temperatures.

== Introduction ==
Diagram of a twin spool jet engine. The high-pressure turbine is connected by a shaft to the high-pressure compressor to form one spool, or complete rotating assembly(purple)- and the low-pressure turbine is connected to the low-pressure compressor to form the other spool (green).

In a gas turbine engine, a single turbine stage is made up of a rotating disk that holds many turbine blades and a stationary ring of nozzle guide vanes in front of the blades. The turbine is connected to a compressor using a shaft (the complete rotating assembly sometimes called a "spool"). Air is compressed, raising the pressure and temperature, as it passes through the compressor. The temperature is then increased by combustion of fuel inside the combustor which is located between the compressor and the turbine. The high-temperature, high-pressure gas then passes through the turbine. The turbine stages extract energy from this flow, lowering the pressure and temperature of the gas and transfer the kinetic energy to the compressor. The way the turbine works is similar to how the compressor works, only in reverse, in so far as energy exchange between the gas and the machine is concerned, for example. There is a direct relationship between how much the gas temperature changes (increase in compressor, decrease in turbine) and the shaft power input (compressor) or output (turbine).

For a turbofan engine the number of turbine stages required to drive the fan increases with the bypass-ratio unless the turbine speed can be increased by adding a gearbox between the turbine and fan in which case fewer stages are required. The number of turbine stages can have a great effect on how the turbine blades are designed for each stage. Many gas turbine engines are twin-spool designs, meaning that there is a high-pressure spool and a low-pressure spool. Other gas turbines use three spools, adding an intermediate-pressure spool between the high- and low-pressure spool. The high-pressure turbine is exposed to the hottest, highest-pressure air, and the low-pressure turbine is subjected to cooler, lower-pressure air. The difference in conditions leads to the design of high-pressure and low-pressure turbine blades that are significantly different in material and cooling choices even though the aerodynamic and thermodynamic principles are the same. Under these severe operating conditions inside the gas and steam turbines, the blades face high temperature, high stresses, and potentially high vibrations. Steam turbine blades are critical components in power plants which convert the linear motion of high-temperature and high-pressure steam flowing down a pressure gradient into a rotary motion of the turbine shaft.

== Environment and failure modes ==
Turbine blades are subjected to very strenuous environments inside a gas turbine. They face high temperatures, high stresses, and a potential environment of high vibration. All three of these factors can lead to blade failures, potentially destroying the engine, therefore turbine blades are carefully designed to resist these conditions.

Turbine blades are subjected to stress from centrifugal force (turbine stages can rotate at tens of thousands of revolutions per minute (RPM)) and fluid forces that can cause fracture, yielding, or creep (Note: Creep is the tendency of a solid material to slowly move or deform permanently under the influence of stresses. It occurs as a result of long term exposure to high levels of stress that are below the yield strength of the material. Creep is more severe in materials that are subjected to heat for long periods, and near the melting point. Creep always increases with temperature. From Creep (deformation).) failures. Additionally, the first stage (the stage directly following the combustor) of a modern gas turbine faces temperatures around 2,500 °F (1,370 °C), up from temperatures around 1,500 °F (820 °C) in early gas turbines. Modern military jet engines, like the Snecma M88, can see turbine temperatures of 2,900 °F (1,590 °C). Those high temperatures can weaken the blades and make them more susceptible to creep failures. The high temperatures can also make the blades susceptible to corrosion failures. Finally, vibrations from the engine and the turbine itself can cause fatigue failures.

Higher temperatures lead to better cycle efficiency in a turbine, calling for a need for materials innovation that continually pushes the previous benchmark. As the most common modes of failure in SC and polycrystalline blades are intrinsically different, SC blades, thanks to their lack of grain boundaries, are ideal for first and second stage turbine blade applications. Turbine blades are typically made of Ni-Cr superalloys, which present a unique microstructure.

Single crystal (SC) superalloys are typically cast with the ⟨001⟩ crystallographic direction along the turbine blade's axis, and often with a controlled secondary orientation, which has been found to be ideal for reducing localized stresses. Their microstructure consists of cuboidal γ′ precipitates aligned along ⟨001⟩ within a γ matrix. These alloys exhibit anisotropic mechanical properties due to the FCC structures of γ and γ′, also known as orthotropic properties. These include tensile and creep properties, which are also influenced by temperature alloy composition. This anisotropy strongly affects deformation and damage during thermo-mechanical fatigue (TMF).

=== Phase Angle ===
- For an in-phase (IP) TMF cycle, maximum tensile loading occurs at the maximum temperature of the cycle. The associated deformation modes are thus high-temperature creep at this tensile loading state, which can be intensified by internal stress and centrifugal force, even at moderate temperatures. Conversely, low temperatures correspond to a compressive state characterized by low-temperature plasticity, typically occurring near or within cooling channels designed into the blade.
- In certain areas, such as the blade platform, with insufficient cooling, they can become “hot spots”. In areas like this, out-of-phase (OP) TMF cycle can be observed. It is characterized by creep relaxation caused by compressive stress at high temperatures, and plastic deformation by tensile stress at low temperatures. Thus, while running and hot, the area will be under compressive stress and will experience creep relaxation, that will translate into tension when returned to room temperature. Oxide formation at high temperatures causes low ductility in SC alloys, which can lead to cracking in tensile stress, so areas experiencing OP oftentimes have shorter lifespans, despite experiencing lower average stress and inelastic strain than IP.
- In comparing the effects of IP vs OP, it is found that maximum tensile stress is the largest contributor to lifetime, resulting in OP having a shorter lifespan.
- TMG is a very damaging process, and its fatigue lifespan for a SC superalloy at any given orientation is 70-90% lower than isothermal cyclic loading conditions at peak temperature.

=== Deformation and Cracking ===
- Deformation in SC alloys tends to be localized due to the lack of grain boundaries and anisotropy of the crystal. Deformation twinning is a common occurrence in SC alloys, which causes crack growth localized to along the twins, leading to failure. It is a leading cause of TMF failure, especially of second-generation SC alloys that contain Re. However, under conditions of temperature or stress gradients along these deformation bands, it can be difficult to interpret mechanics.

Fatigue crack paths in SC initiate with Mode I tensile opening and are subsequently propagated by crystallographic shearing along slip planes. This is in opposition to the behavior of conventional crack growth that follows the Stage I/Stage II pattern of crack nucleation (crystal shear) and steady growth (Mode I).

- In OP-TMF, oxidation-fatigue interactions, and γ′ coarsening at high temperatures are the main causes of crack nucleation. Cracks tend to form in spots with oxide growth, the process of which is exacerbated by high temperature loading conditions, leading to well-defined, planar cracks-a key feature of brittle materials. It has been observed that localized clusters of twinned plates form ahead of the crack tip on the {1 1 1} plane, also known as deformation twinning. This is caused by partial dislocation movement in the corresponding slip system ({1 1 1}<112>). When big enough, they enable crack propagation, preferentially localized to along the twins.
- Without the temperature cycling, in low cycle fatigue (LCF), the deformation mode is dominated by diffusion-based mechanisms.
- While most propagation takes place at the low temperature part of the OP-TMF cycle, the high temperature and compressive state is responsible for damage caused by dissolution and recrystallization of the γ′ phase at the crack tip. Study of crack closure shows that crack growth rate is independent of maximum cycle temperature and dwell time as a function of change in effective stress intensity factor (ΔK_{eff}), indicating that the driving force for crack propagation is mitigated by stress relief at the crack tip as a result of closure.
- For IP-TMF, cracks tend to form at weak interfaces. There is no observable difference between crack growth rate as a function of ΔK_{eff}, showing a similar outcome to the corresponding LCF conditions. At prolonged hold times a reduction in crack growth closure and increase in K result in crack growth. Thus, IP-TMF and LCF tests are also described by crack growth rate vs ΔK_{eff}.
- Under stress-controlled conditions, IP has the shortest fatigue life, followed by LCF, then OP.

==== Dwell Time ====
The addition of a compressive hold time impacts the direction of crack propagation as observed in OP-TMF. Without a dwell time, cracks initiate at the surface (at areas of oxidation spiking), and grow perpendicular to the direction of applied stress, before the growth along twin plates. Upon extension of dwell time beyond 10 minutes, the crack directly grows along the twin plates until failure. Application of dwell time decreases fatigue lifespan, even at high temperatures, likely as a result of stress relaxation, failure mode, increased inelastic strain, and high tensile mean stress. For IP-TMF, the effects of dwell time on crack initiation and propagation are accurately predicted by a combined model of fatigue and creep.

The yield strength anomaly in the pure γ′ phase describes a state in which the material has a higher yield strength at higher temperatures, so the impressive mechanical properties of SC superalloys is a result of the interaction between the γ and γ′ phases’ cuboidal structure. However, this state is unstable, and rafting formed as a result of high temperature and long dwell times in TMF tests will weaken the material, leading to a lower yield stress. This effect is thus exacerbated by lower values for minimum temperature in TMF cycles. As the yield stress decreases, the inelastic strain range increases, and cracks form sooner.

==== Crystal Orientation ====
===== Stiffness =====
TMF life for a given strain range is determined by the elastic modulus with respect to strain orientation in a strain controlled TMF test. For Ni alloys, the [001] direction exhibits lower stiffness, suppressing stress, and corresponding to a longer life. Typically fatigue lifespan of the different crystal orientations in the controlled strain test is longest in <001>, which displays elastic cycling behavior, followed by <011> then <111>, which both display plastic deformation. Creep damage is the leading cause of fracture, characterized by octahedral slip planes in <001> and <011>, and cubic in <111>, which can be expected for FCC. Additionally, due to the <001> direction’s ability to be exposed to TMF, there is opportunity for rafting to develop, in which the γ’ strengthening phase has the opportunity to coalesce into plates. For loading in <001>, OP-TMF leads to P-type (parallel to loading direction) rafting, and IP-TMF leads to N-type (perpendicular to loading direction).

===== Slip planes =====
Fatigue life is also impacted by the number of slip planes. For crystallographic orientations with a higher number of active slip planes, the deformation is less localized, improving fatigue life in OP-TMF.

==== Twinning ====
Twinning is seen less in <011>-oriented samples in OP-TMF than in <001>

=== Low cycle fatigue (LCF) ===
LCF is characterized by high strain applied over a low number of cycles at constant temperature. For <001> and <111> -oriented specimens, cycle softening, or a reduction in failure stress, is observed at high temperatures, due to the dissolution of the γ’ phase, dislocation removal, and precipitates, the creation of dislocations at phase interfaces to relieve stress, and the removal of dislocations via thermally activated mechanisms. In low-strain conditions, in <111>-oriented SC specimens experience cyclic hardening, or the increase in failure stress, as a result of the formation of aligned dislocation arrays in the matrix preventing interactions between dislocations from other slip systems. This reduces the fatigue life of the <111> oriented SC turbine blades.

Fatigue resistance improves with a uniform distribution of secondary γ′ precipitates in the γ matrix. Cracks typically initiate and grow along persistent slip bands (PSBs). However, at high temperatures and strain levels, cracks form earlier due to dislocation entanglement and stress-driven coarsening of γ′ precipitates.

=== High cycle fatigue ===
High cycle fatigue (HCF) is the leading cause of SC turbine blade failure, characterized by a high cycle number and a low amplitude stress field, that leads to elastic deformation. There is no difference between fatigue life between <001> or <111> orientations in HCF testing, however, features that concentrate stress, such as holes or notches, can increase the number of endured loading cycles before failure. These stress concentrators cause samples to not display cleavage planes upon fracture, similarly to polycrystalline specimens.

A rough zone with multiple planar facets forms at crack initiation sites due to stress concentrations. Slip bands tend to develop near stress concentrators, inducing formation of slip bands, while casting defects create localized high shear stress but have a lower K than the overall specimen threshold. Intense shear forces around these defects lead to recrystallization and cavitation at high temperatures by creation of nucleation sites. Additionally, some superalloys precipitate topologically close packed structures and carbide precipitations in the rough zone, causing slip band formation away from the defect area. When the rough zone’s K reaches the global threshold, macroscopic HCF cracks propagate.

=== Fretting Fatigue ===
Fretting fatigue is typically a result of intense vibrations experienced by the joints and discs of turbine blades during operation, due to centrifugal and aerodynamic forces. This causes stress concentrations that induce fatigue and eventually, failure via increased crack nucleation. Dislocations can move through any of 12 slip planes in a coherent FCC crystal. As temperature increases, slip line density decreases, with respect to crystallographic orientation. Thus, fracture is the primary mode of deformation.

== Materials ==
A limiting factor in early jet engines was the performance of the materials available for the hot section (combustor and turbine) of the engine. The need for better materials spurred much research in the field of alloys and manufacturing techniques, and that research resulted in a long list of new materials and methods that make modern gas turbines possible. One of the earliest of these was Nimonic, used in the British Whittle engines.

The development of superalloys in the 1940s and new processing methods such as vacuum induction melting in the 1950s greatly increased the temperature capability of turbine blades. Further processing methods like hot isostatic pressing improved the alloys used for turbine blades and increased turbine blade performance. Modern turbine blades often use nickel-based superalloys that incorporate chromium, cobalt, and rhenium.

Aside from alloy improvements, a major breakthrough was the development of directional solidification (DS) and single crystal (SC) production methods. These methods help greatly increase strength against fatigue and creep by aligning grain boundaries in one direction (DS) or by eliminating grain boundaries altogether (SC). SC research began in the 1960s with Pratt and Whitney and took about 10 years to be implemented. One of the first implementations of DS was with the J58 engines of the SR-71.

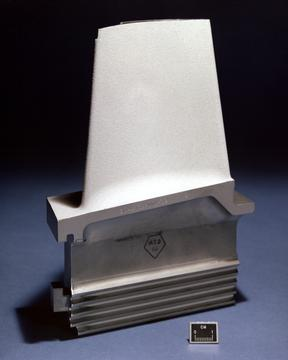
A turbine blade with thermal barrier coating. This blade has no tip shroud so tip leakage is controlled by the clearance between the tip and a stationary shroud ring attached to the turbine case.

Another major improvement to turbine blade material technology was the development of thermal barrier coatings (TBC). Where DS and SC developments improved creep and fatigue resistance, TBCs improved corrosion and oxidation resistance, both of which became greater concerns as temperatures increased. The first TBCs, applied in the 1970s, were aluminide coatings. Improved ceramic coatings became available in the 1980s. These coatings increased turbine blade temperature capability by about 200 °F (90 °C). The coatings also improve blade life, almost doubling the life of turbine blades in some cases.

Most turbine blades are manufactured by investment casting (or lost-wax processing). This process involves making a precise negative die of the blade shape that is filled with wax to form the blade shape. If the blade is hollow (i.e., it has internal cooling passages), a ceramic core in the shape of the passage is inserted into the middle. The wax blade is coated with a heat-resistant material to make a shell, and then that shell is filled with the blade alloy. This step can be more complicated for DS or SC materials, but the process is similar. If there is a ceramic core in the middle of the blade, it is dissolved in a solution that leaves the blade hollow. The blades are coated with a TBC, and then any cooling holes are machined.

Ceramic matrix composites (CMC), where fibers are embedded in a matrix of polymer derived ceramics, are being developed for use in turbine blades. The main advantage of CMCs over conventional superalloys is their light weight and high temperature capability. SiC/SiC composites consisting of a silicon carbide matrix reinforced by silicon carbide fibers have been shown to withstand operating temperatures 200°-300 °F higher than nickel superalloys. GE Aviation successfully demonstrated the use of such SiC/SiC composite blades for the low-pressure turbine of its F414 jet engine.

=== List of turbine blade materials ===
Note: This list is not inclusive of all alloys used in turbine blades.

- U-500 This material was used as a first stage (the most demanding stage) material in the 1960s, and is now used in later, less demanding, stages.
- Rene 77
- Rene N5
- Rene N6
- PWA1484
- CMSX-4
- CMSX-10
- Inconel
  - IN-738 – GE used IN-738 as a first stage blade material from 1971 until 1984, when it was replaced by GTD-111. It is now used as a second stage material. It was specifically designed for land-based turbines rather than aircraft gas turbines.
- GTD-111 Blades made from directionally solidified GTD-111 are being used in many GE Energy gas turbines in the first stage. Blades made from equiaxed GTD-111 are being used in later stages.
- EPM-102 (MX4 (GE), PWA 1497 (P&W)) is a single crystal superalloy jointly developed by NASA, GE Aviation, and Pratt & Whitney for the High Speed Civil Transport (HSCT). While the HSCT program was cancelled, the alloy is still being considered for use by GE and P&W.
- Nimonic 80a was used for the turbine blades on the Rolls-Royce Nene and de Havilland Ghost
- Nimonic 90 was used on the Bristol Proteus.
- Nimonic 105 was used on the Rolls-Royce Spey.
- Nimonic 263 was used in the combustion chambers of the Bristol Olympus used on the Concorde supersonic airliner.
- 3D printed thermoplastic resin to create wind turbine blades is in development in a partnership between ORNL, NREL, and GE Renewable Energy.

== Cooling ==
At a constant pressure ratio, thermal efficiency of the engine increases as the turbine entry temperature (TET) increases. However, high temperatures can damage the turbine, as the blades are under large centrifugal stresses and materials are weaker at high temperature. So, turbine blade cooling is essential for the first stages but since the gas temperature drops through each stage it is not required for later stages such as in the low pressure turbine or a power turbine. Current modern turbine designs are operating with inlet temperatures higher than 1900 kelvins which is achieved by actively cooling the turbine components.

=== Methods of cooling ===
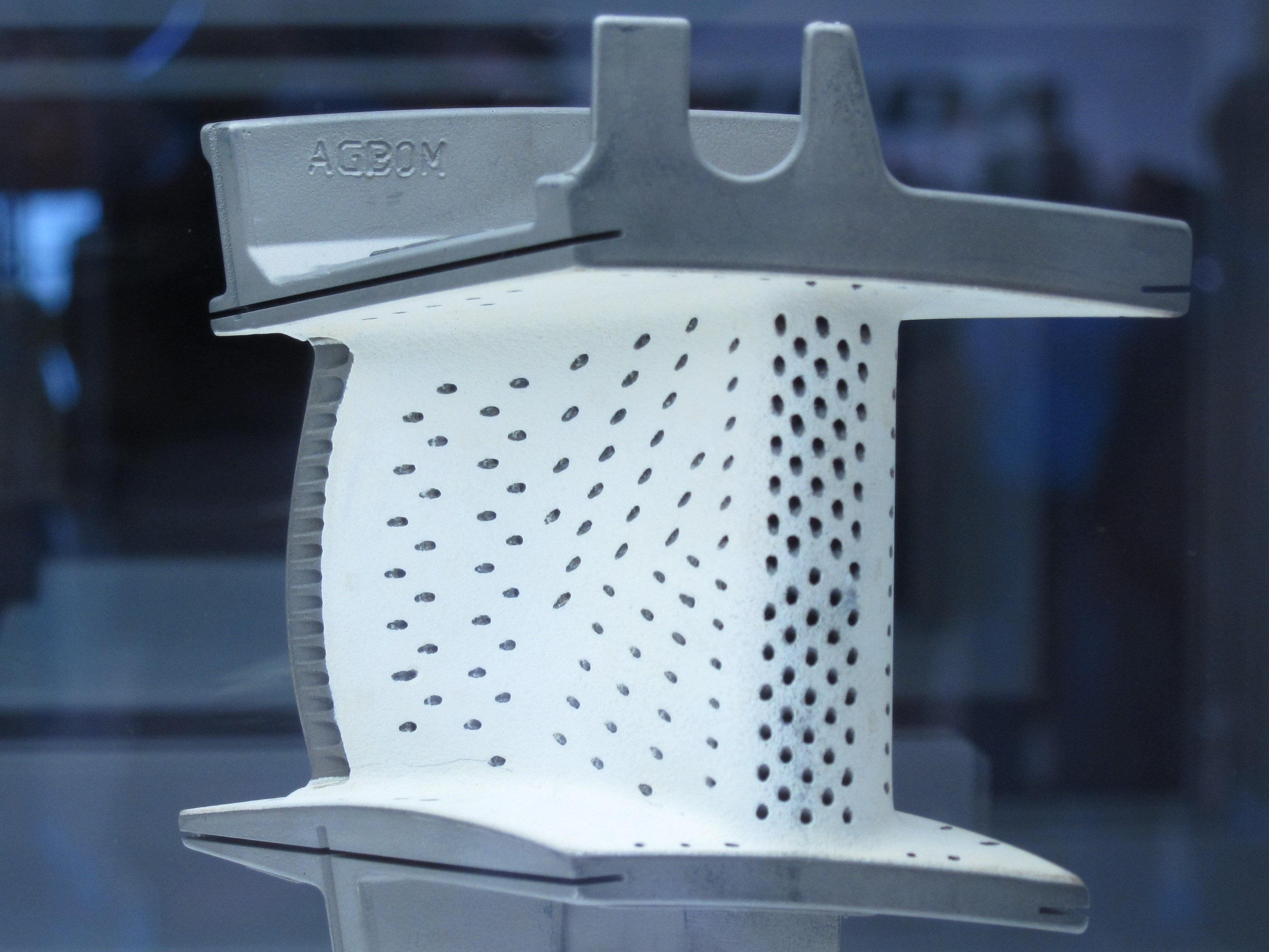
Laser-drilled holes permit film cooling in this first-stage V2500 nozzle guide vane.

Turbine blades are cooled using air, except for limited use of steam cooling in a combined cycle power plant. Water cooling has been extensively tested but has never been introduced. The General Electric "H" class gas turbine has cooled rotating blades and static vanes using steam from a combined cycle steam turbine although GE was reported in 2012 to be going back to air-cooling for its "FlexEfficiency" units. Liquid cooling seems to be more attractive because of high specific heat capacity and chances of evaporative cooling but there can be leakage, corrosion, choking and other problems which work against this method. On the other hand, air cooling allows the discharged air into main flow without any problem. Quantity of air required for this purpose is 1–3% of main flow and blade temperature can be reduced by 200–300 °C. There are many techniques of cooling used in gas turbine blades; convection, film, transpiration cooling, cooling effusion, pin fin cooling etc. which fall under the categories of internal and external cooling. While all methods have their differences, they all work by using cooler air taken from the compressor to remove heat from the turbine blades.

=== Internal cooling ===
==== Convection cooling ====
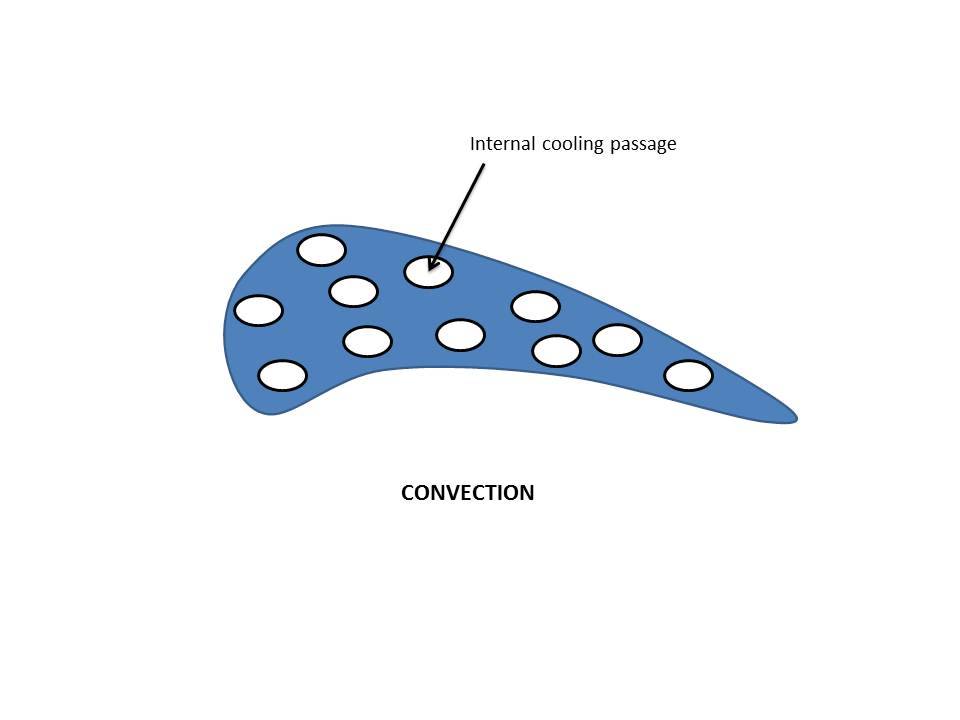
Blade cooling by convection

It works by passing cooling air through passages internal to the blade. Heat is transferred by conduction through the blade, and then by convection into the air flowing inside of the blade. A large internal surface area is desirable for this method, so the cooling paths tend to be serpentine and full of small fins. The internal passages in the blade may be circular or elliptical in shape. Cooling is achieved by passing the air through these passages from hub towards the blade tip. This cooling air comes from an air compressor. In case of gas turbine the fluid outside is relatively hot which passes through the cooling passage and mixes with the main stream at the blade tip.

==== Impingement cooling ====
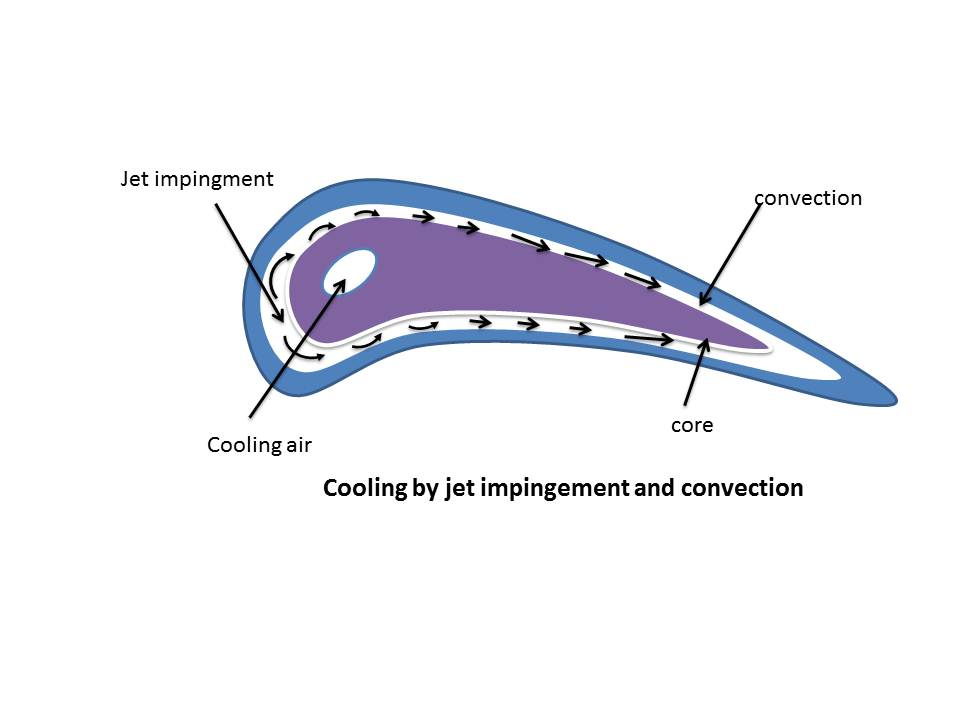
Impingement

A variation of convection cooling, impingement cooling, works by hitting the inner surface of the blade with high velocity air. This allows more heat to be transferred by convection than regular convection cooling does. Impingement cooling is used in the regions of greatest heat loads. In case of turbine blades, the leading edge has maximum temperature and thus heat load. Impingement cooling is also used in mid chord of the vane. Blades are hollow with a core. There are internal cooling passages. Cooling air enters from the leading edge region and turns towards the trailing edge.

=== External cooling ===
==== Film cooling ====
Rendering of a turbine blade with cooling holes for film cooling

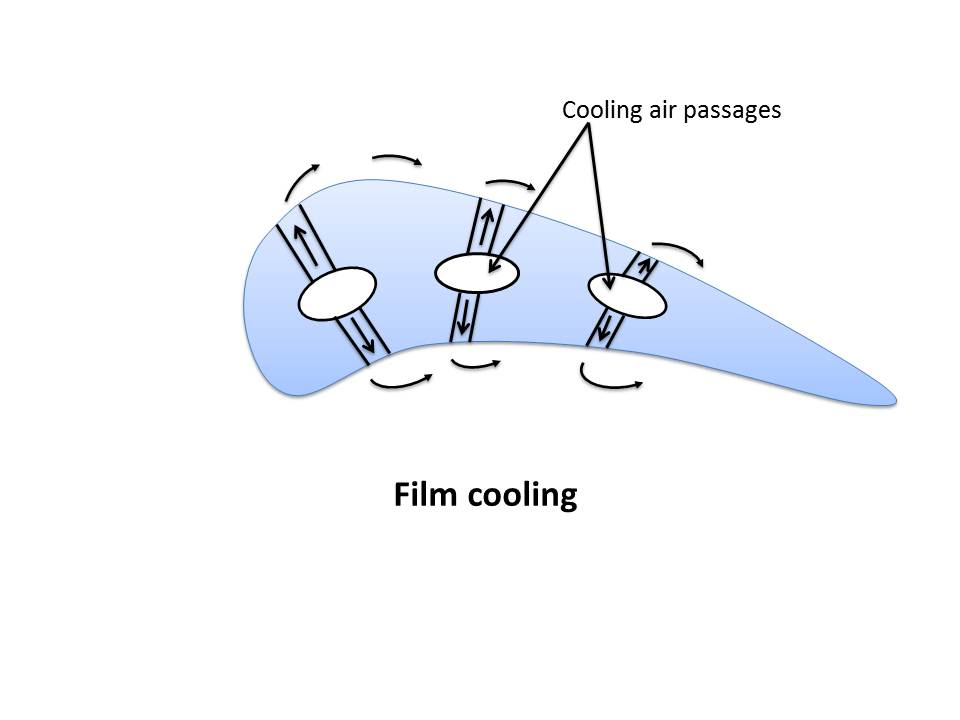
Film cooling

Film cooling (also called thin film cooling), a widely used type, allows for higher cooling effectiveness than either convection and impingement cooling. This technique consists of pumping the cooling air out of the blade through multiple small holes or slots in the structure. A thin layer (the film) of cooling air is then created on the external surface of the blade, reducing the heat transfer from main flow, whose temperature (1300–1800 kelvins) can exceed the melting point of the blade material (1300–1400 kelvins). The ability of the film cooling system to cool the surface is typically evaluated using a parameter called cooling effectiveness. Higher cooling effectiveness (with maximum value of one) indicates that the blade material temperature is closer to the coolant temperature. In locations where the blade temperature approaches the hot gas temperature, the cooling effectiveness approaches to zero. The cooling effectiveness is mainly affected by the coolant flow parameters and the injection geometry. Coolant flow parameters include the velocity, density, blowing and momentum ratios which are calculated using the coolant and mainstream flow characteristics. Injection geometry parameters consist of hole or slot geometry (i.e. cylindrical, shaped holes or slots) and injections angle. A United States Air Force program in the early 1970s funded the development of a turbine blade that was both film and convection cooled, and that method has become common in modern turbine blades.

Injecting the cooler bleed into the flow reduces turbine isentropic efficiency; the compression of the cooling air (which does not contribute power to the engine) incurs an energetic penalty; and the cooling circuit adds considerable complexity to the engine. All of these factors have to be compensated by the increase in overall performance (power and efficiency) allowed by the increase in turbine temperature.

In recent years, researchers have suggested using plasma actuator for film cooling. The film cooling of turbine blades by using a dielectric barrier discharge plasma actuator was first proposed by Roy and Wang. A horseshoe-shaped plasma actuator, which is set in the vicinity of holes for gas flow, has been shown to improve the film cooling effectiveness significantly. Following the previous research, recent reports using both experimental and numerical methods demonstrated the effect of cooling enhancement by 15% using a plasma actuator.

==== Cooling effusion ====
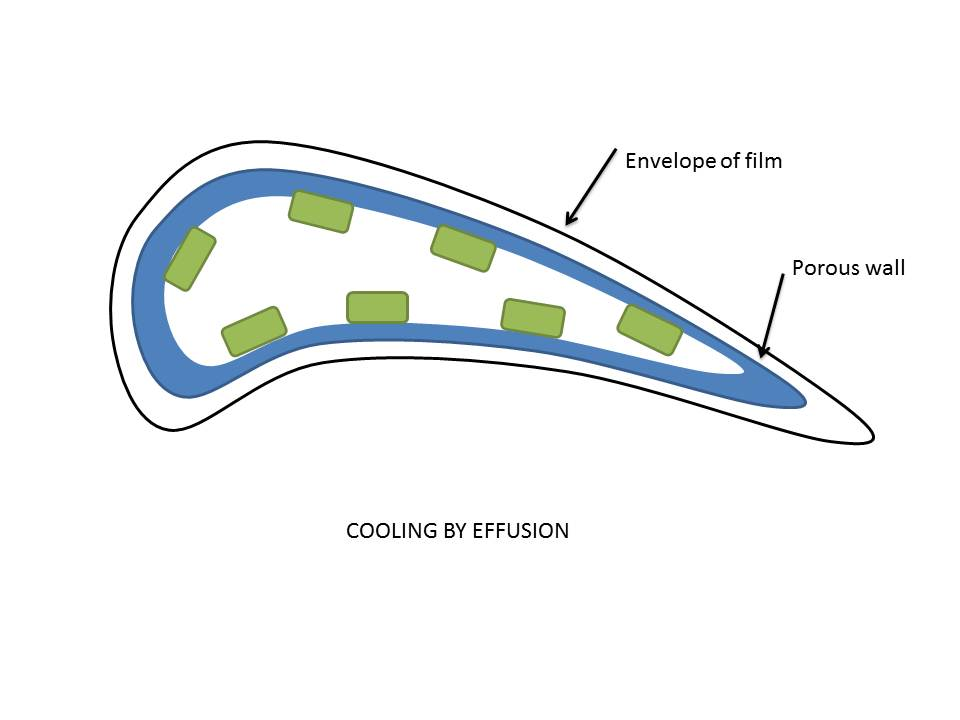
Cooling by effusion

The blade surface is made of porous material which means having a large number of small orifices on the surface. Cooling air is forced through these porous holes which forms a film or cooler boundary layer. Besides this uniform cooling is caused by effusion of the coolant over the entire blade surface.

==== Pin fin cooling ====
In the narrow trailing edge film cooling is used to enhance heat transfer from the blade. There is an array of pin fins on the blade surface. Heat transfer takes place from this array and through the side walls. As the coolant flows across the fins with high velocity, the flow separates and wakes are formed. Many factors contribute towards heat transfer rate among which the type of pin fin and the spacing between fins are the most significant.

==== Transpiration cooling ====
This is similar to film cooling in that it creates a thin film of cooling air on the blade, but it is different in that air is "leaked" through a porous shell rather than injected through holes. This type of cooling is effective at high temperatures as it uniformly covers the entire blade with cool air. Transpiration-cooled blades generally consist of a rigid strut with a porous shell. Air flows through internal channels of the strut and then passes through the porous shell to cool the blade. As with film cooling, increased cooling air decreases turbine efficiency, therefore that decrease has to be balanced with improved temperature performance.

== See also ==
- Components of jet engines
- Combustor
- High temperature corrosion
- Gas turbine
- Superalloys
