= Yield strength anomaly =

In materials science, yield strength anomaly is the phenomenon of a material's yield strength (that is, the stress necessary to initiate plastic yielding) increasing as temperature increases; for the majority of materials, the opposite is true. In metals without the yield strength anomaly, yield strength decreases as a result of the thermal activation of dislocation motion, resulting in easier plastic deformation at higher temperatures.

In some cases, a yield strength anomaly refers to a decrease in the ductility of a material with increasing temperature, which is also opposite the trend in the majority of materials. Anomalies in ductility can be more clear, as an anomalous effect on yield strength can be obscured by its typical decrease with temperature. In concert with yield strength or ductility anomalies, some materials demonstrate extrema in other temperature dependent properties, such as a minimum in ultrasonic damping, or a maximum in electrical conductivity.

The yield strength anomaly in β-brass was one of the earliest discoveries such a phenomenon, and several other ordered intermetallic alloys demonstrate this effect. Precipitation-hardened superalloys exhibit a yield strength anomaly over a considerable temperature range. For these materials, the yield strength shows little variation between room temperature and several hundred degrees Celsius. Eventually, a maximum yield strength is reached. For even higher temperatures, the yield strength decreases and, eventually, drops to zero when reaching the melting temperature, where the solid material transforms into a liquid. For ordered intermetallics, the temperature of the yield strength peak is roughly 50% of the absolute melting temperature.

== Mechanisms ==
=== Thermally Activated Cross Slip ===
A number of alloys with the L1_{2} structure (e.g., Ni_{3}Al, Ni_{3}Ga, Ni_{3}Ge, Ni_{3}Si), show yield strength anomalies. The L1_{2} structure is a derivative of the face-centered cubic crystal structure. For these alloys, the active slip system below the peak is ⟨110⟩{111} while the active system at higher temperatures is ⟨110⟩{010}. The hardening mechanism in these alloys is the cross slip of screw dislocations from (111) to (010) crystallographic planes. This cross slip is thermally activated, and the screw dislocations are much less mobile on the (010) planes, so the material is strengthened as temperatures increases and more screw dislocations are in the (010) plane. A similar mechanism has been proposed for some B2 alloys that have yield strength anomalies (e.g., CuZn, FeCo, NiTi, CoHf, CoTi, CoZr).

The yield strength anomaly mechanism in Ni-based superalloys is similar. In these alloys, screw superdislocations undergo thermally activated cross slip onto {100} planes from {111} planes. This prevents motion of the remaining parts of the dislocations on the (111)[-101] slip system. Again, with increasing temperature, more cross-slip occurs, so dislocation motion is more hindered and yield strength increases.

=== Grain Boundary Precipitation ===
In superalloys strengthened by metal carbides, increasingly large carbide particles form preferentially at grain boundaries, preventing grain boundary sliding at high temperatures. This leads to an increase in the yield strength, and thus a yield strength anomaly.

=== Vacancy Activated Strengthening ===
While FeAl is a B2 alloy, the observed yield strength anomaly in FeAl is due to another mechanism. If cross-slip were the mechanism, then the yield strength anomaly would be rate dependent, as expected for a thermally activated process. Instead, yield strength anomaly is state dependent, which is a property that is dependent on the state of the material. As a result, vacancy activated strengthening is the most widely accepted mechanism. The vacancy formation energy is low for FeAl, allowing for an unusually high concentration of vacancies in FeAl at high temperatures (2.5% at 1000C for Fe-50Al). The vacancy formed in either aluminum-rich FeAl or through heating is an aluminum vacancy.

At low temperatures around 300K, the yield strength either decreases or does not change with temperature. At moderate temperatures (0.35-0.45 T_{m}), yield strength has been observed to increase with an increased vacancy concentration, providing further evidence for a vacancy driven strengthening mechanism. The increase in yield strength from increased vacancy concentration is believed to be the result of dislocations being pinned by vacancies on the slip plane, causing the dislocations to bow. Then, above the peak stress temperature, vacancies can migrate as vacancy migration is easier with elevated temperatures. At those temperatures, vacancies no longer hinder dislocation motion but rather aid climb. In the vacancy strengthening model, the increased strength below the peak stress temperature is approximated as proportional to the vacancy concentration to the one-half with the vacancy concentration estimated using Maxwell-Boltzmann statistics. Thus, the strength can be estimated as $e^{-E_f/2k_BT}$, with $E_f$ being the vacancy formation energy and T being the absolute temperature. Above the peak stress temperature, a diffusion-assisted deformation mechanism can be used to describe strength since vacancies are now mobile and assist dislocation motion. Above the peak, the yield strength is strain rate dependent and thus, the peak yield strength is rate dependent. As a result, the peak stress temperature increases with an increased strain rate. Note, this is different than the yield strength anomaly, which is the yield strength below the peak, being rate dependent. The peak yield strength is also dependent on percent aluminum in the FeAl alloy. As the percent aluminum increases, the peak yield strength occurs at lower temperatures.

The yield strength anomaly in FeAl alloys can be hidden if thermal vacancies are not minimized through a slow anneal at a relatively low temperature (~400 °C for ~5 days). Further, the yield strength anomaly is not present in systems that use a very low strain rate as the peak yield strength is strain rate dependent and thus, would occur at temperatures too low to observe the yield strength anomaly. Additionally, since the formation of vacancies requires time, the peak yield strength magnitude is dependent on how long the material is held at the peak stress temperature. Also, the peak yield strength has been found not to be dependent on crystal orientation.

Other mechanisms have been proposed including a cross slip mechanism similar to that for L1_{2}, dislocation decomposition into less mobile segments at jogs, dislocation pinning, climb-lock mechanism, and slip vector transition. The slip vector transition from <111> to <100>. At the peak stress temperature, the slip system changes from <111> to <100>. The change is believed to be a result of glide in <111> becoming more difficult as temperature increases due to a friction mechanism. Then, dislocations in <100> have easier movement in comparison. Another mechanism combines the vacancy strengthening mechanism with dislocation decomposition. FeAl with the addition of a tertiary additive such as Mn has been shown to also exhibit the yield stress anomaly. In contrast to FeAl, however, the peak yield strength or peak stress temperature of Fe_{2}MnAl is not dependent on strain rate and thus, may not follow the vacancy activated strengthening mechanism. Instead, there an order-strengthening mechanism has been proposed.

== Applications ==
=== Turbines and Jet Engines ===
The yield strength anomaly is exploited in the design of gas turbines and jet engines that operate at high temperatures, where the materials used are selected based on their paramount yield and creep resistance. Superalloys can withstand high temperature loads far beyond the capabilities of steels and other alloys, and allow operation at higher temperatures, which improves efficiency.

=== Nuclear Reactors ===
Materials with yield strength anomalies are used in nuclear reactors due to their high temperature mechanical properties and good corrosion resistance.
