= Inconel 718 =

Nickel-based superalloy

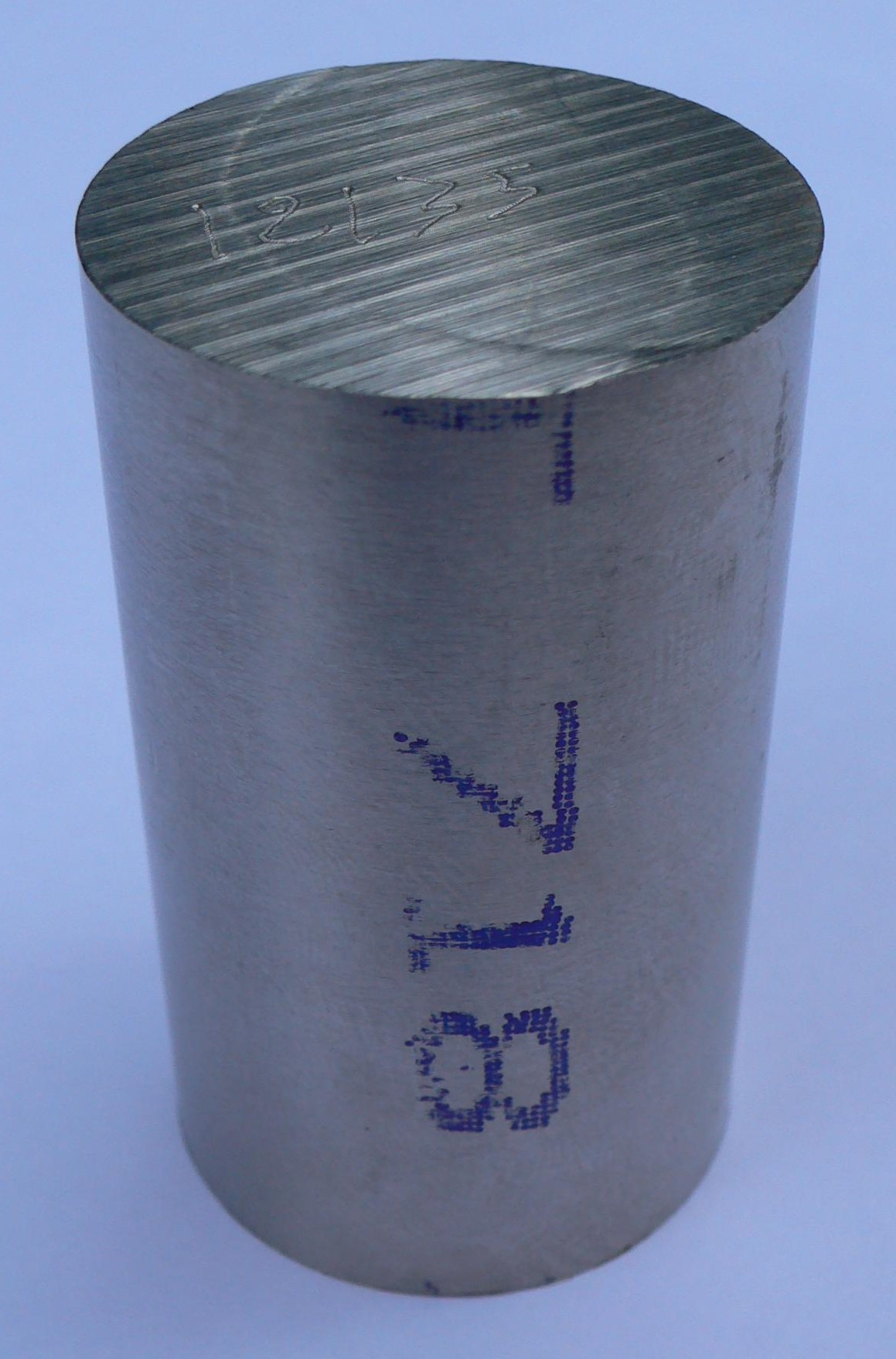
- A billet of Inconel 718
- Synonym: IN718, Werkstoff 2.4668
- Material type: Alloy

Alloy properties
- UNS identifier: N07718
- Alloy type: Nickel-based superalloy
- Composition: Ni: 50.00–55.00%; Cr: 17.00–21.00%; Mo: 2.80–3.30%; Fe: balance; Nb + Ta: 4.75–5.5%; Al: 0.20–0.80%; Ti: 0.65–1.15%; Co: 1.00% max.; Mn: 0.35% max.; Si: 0.35% max.; C: 0.08% max.; P: 0.015% max.; S: 0.015% max.; B: 0.006% max.; Cu: 0.30% max.

Physical properties
- Density (ρ): 8.2 g/cm^{3}

Mechanical properties
- Young's modulus (E): 216–99 GPa @ −308–2,000 °F (−189–1,093 °C)
- Tensile strength (σ_{t}): Rod, bar, plate: 142–160 ksi (979–1,103 MPa) (peak aged)
- Elongation (ε) at break: Rod, bar, plate: 18–25% (peak aged)
- Poisson's ratio (ν): 0.25–0.402 @ −308–2,000 °F (−189–1,093 °C)

Thermal properties
- Melting temperature (T_{m}): 2,300–2,440 °F (1,260–1,338 °C)
- Thermal conductivity (k): 77 BTU/(hr·ft⋅°F) @ 70 °F (21 °C) – 196 BTU/(hr·ft⋅°F) @ 2,000 °F (1,093 °C)
- Specific heat capacity (c): 0.104 BTU/(lb⋅°F) (0.435 J/g⋅°C)

Inconel Alloy 718 (UNS designation N07718) is one of the most commonly used nickel-based superalloys, an alloy class defined by high strength and resistance to elevated temperatures, corrosion, and oxidation. IN718 is especially designed for fatigue and creep resistance at temperatures up to 700 °C.The oxidation and corrosion resistance of Alloy 718 combined with its high strength are derived from the formation of gamma double prime ($\gamma''$) and gamma prime ($\gamma'$) precipitates during age hardening, primarily facilitated by the addition of niobium (Nb)

Inconel 718 was incidentally developed in the 1960s during INCO's development of Inconel 625. The purpose of its development was to create material that could be used for steam-line piping. Because of its excellent properties, IN718 is commonly used in aerospace (such as gas turbine engine components and cryogenic storage tanks), petrochemical (wellhead tools and high-strength bolting), and power generation industries.

== Microstructure ==
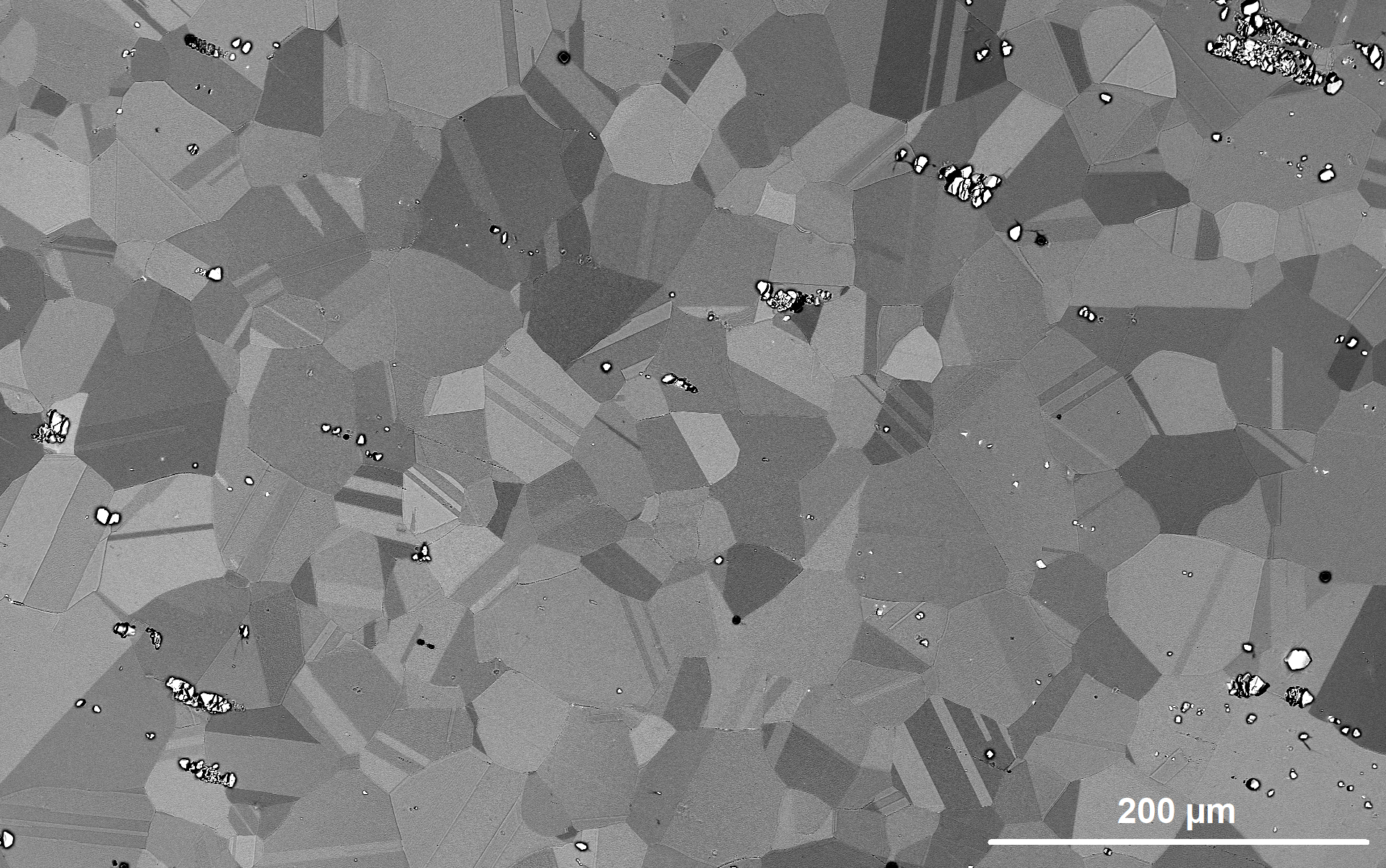
SEM micrograph of Ni-based superalloy Inconel 718 heat treated according to NACE MR0175

=== Strengthening Phases ===
Inconel 718 is an age-hardenable austenitic alloy. The microstructure of IN718 is made up of a face-centered cubic (FCC) matrix with large amounts of strengthening second phases. The most important of these are the γ' and γ'' nanoscale intermetallics - FCC Ni_{3}(Al, Ti, Nb) and body-centered tetragonal (BCT) Ni_{3}Nb, respectively. The γ' phase is fully coherent in the FCC matrix, making it highly stable, even with extended exposure to elevated temperatures. The γ' phase acts as a barrier to dislocation motion, and forms anti-phase boundaries when sheared, thus increasing the energy required to plastically deform the alloy. The γ'' phase offers even greater strengthening, as the FCC-BCT lattice mismatch imparts a large coherency hardening effect. Carbides are also an important strengthening phase, primarily in the form MC, but also as M_{2}C and M_{7}C_{3}, where M is a major alloying element. These carbides typically form on the alloy's grain boundaries, thus pinning them and inhibiting grain boundary sliding, a process required for low temperature diffusional creep. Unlike many other Ni-based superalloys, the M_{23}C_{6} carbide is not formed.

=== Deleterious Phases ===
In addition to the strengthening phases described above, there are multiple phases that weaken IN718, including the δ phase and the Laves phase. The δ phase has the composition Ni_{3}Nb and an orthorhombic crystal structure. It forms between the temperatures of 700 °C and 1000 °C. with a peak precipitation rate at ~900 °C. The δ phase is more stable than the γ'' phase (also Ni_{3}Nb), though it precipitates very sluggishly. Hence, the δ phase will not precipitate until it is kinetically favorable, and γ'' will be lost as a result. The δ phase typically nucleates at grain boundaries and grows as thin plates into the grain. The presence of δ indicates a loss of γ'' and thus lessens the alloy's hardenability. Additionally, it has been shown that the δ phase is associated with an increased susceptibility to hot cracking. The δ phase can, however, be used to strengthen the alloy during processing. Because it nucleates at grain boundaries, it can be used to pin then during forging, thus controlling grain size.

The Laves phase has the composition (Ni, Fe, Cr)_{2}(Nb, Mo, Ti) and a hexagonal topologically close-packed structure. It forms when the alloy is subjected to temperatures above ~1000 °C. The Laves phase forms in large globular aggregates within the IN718 matrix. Because the Laves phase is significantly richer in Nb than any of the strengthening phases, its presence requires a depletion of γ' and γ'', and thus weakens the material significantly. Additionally, the Laves phase is very brittle and thus reduces the toughness by acting as a crack nucleation site for fracture. Furthermore, it can reduce IN718's mechanical properties through melting and microfissuring.

== Applications ==
Inconel 718 has a wide array of uses, including, but not limited to:

- Aircraft turbine engines
- Steam-line piping
- Petrochemical fasteners, valves, and springs
- Rocket engines
- Nuclear power generation
- Aircraft compressor airfoils
- Suppressors

== See also ==
- Inconel
- Incoloy
- Monel
- Hastelloy
- Nimonic
