= Precipitation hardening =

Heat treatment technique used to increase the yield strength of malleable materials

Precipitation hardening, also called age hardening or particle hardening, is a heat treatment technique used to increase the yield strength of malleable materials, including most structural alloys of aluminium, magnesium, nickel, titanium, and some steels, stainless steels, and duplex stainless steel. In superalloys, it is known to cause yield strength anomaly providing excellent high-temperature strength.

Precipitation hardening relies on changes in solid solubility with temperature to produce fine particles of an impurity phase, which impede the movement of dislocations, or defects in a crystal's lattice. Since dislocations are often the dominant carriers of plasticity, this serves to harden the material. The impurities play the same role as the particle substances in particle-reinforced composite materials. Just as the formation of ice in air can produce clouds, snow, or hail, depending upon the thermal history of a given portion of the atmosphere, precipitation in solids can produce many different sizes of particles, which have radically different properties. Unlike ordinary tempering, alloys must be kept at elevated temperature for hours to allow precipitation to take place. This time delay is called "aging". Solution treatment and aging is sometimes abbreviated "STA" in specifications and certificates for metals.

Two different heat treatments involving precipitates can alter the strength of a material: solution heat treating and precipitation heat treating. Solid solution strengthening involves formation of a single-phase solid solution via quenching. Precipitation heat treating involves the addition of impurity particles to increase a material's strength.

== Kinetics versus thermodynamics ==
This technique exploits the phenomenon of supersaturation, and involves careful balancing of the driving force for precipitation and the thermal activation energy available for both desirable and undesirable processes. The most commonly accepted theory behind precipitation is classical nucleation theory (CNT).

Nucleation occurs at a relatively high temperature (often just below the solubility limit) so that the kinetic barrier of surface energy can be more easily overcome and the maximum number of precipitate particles can form. These particles are then allowed to grow at lower temperature in a process called ageing. This is carried out under conditions of low solubility so that thermodynamics drive a greater total volume of precipitate formation.

Diffusion's exponential dependence upon temperature makes precipitation strengthening, like all heat treatments, a fairly delicate process. Too little diffusion (under ageing), and the particles will be too small to impede dislocations effectively; too much (over ageing), and they will be too large and dispersed to interact with the majority of dislocations.

== Alloy design ==
Precipitation strengthening is possible if the line of solid solubility slopes strongly toward the center of a phase diagram. While a large volume of precipitate particles is desirable, a small enough amount of the alloying element should be added so that it remains easily soluble at some reasonable annealing temperature. Although large volumes are often wanted, they are wanted in small particle sizes as to avoid a decrease in strength as is explained below.

Elements used for precipitation strengthening in typical aluminium and titanium alloys make up about 10% of their composition. While binary alloys are more easily understood as an academic exercise, commercial alloys often use three components for precipitation strengthening, in compositions such as Al(Mg, Cu) and Ti(Al, V). A large number of other constituents may be unintentional, but benign, or may be added for other purposes such as grain refinement or corrosion resistance. An example is the addition of Sc and Zr to aluminum alloys to form FCC L1_{2} structures that help refine grains and strengthen the material. In some cases, such as many aluminium alloys, an increase in strength is achieved at the expense of corrosion resistance. More recent technology is focused on additive manufacturing due to the higher amount of metastable phases that can be obtained due to the fast cooling, whereas traditional casting is more limited to equilibrium phases.

The addition of large amounts of nickel and chromium needed for corrosion resistance in stainless steels means that traditional hardening and tempering methods are not effective. However, precipitates of chromium, copper, or other elements can strengthen the steel by similar amounts in comparison to hardening and tempering. The strength can be tailored by adjusting the annealing process, with lower initial temperatures resulting in higher strengths. The lower initial temperatures increase the driving force of nucleation. More driving force means more nucleation sites, and more sites means more places for dislocations to be disrupted while the finished part is in use.

Many alloy systems allow the ageing temperature to be adjusted. For instance, some aluminium alloys used to make rivets for aircraft construction are kept in dry ice from their initial heat treatment until they are installed in the structure. After this type of rivet is deformed into its final shape, ageing occurs at room temperature and increases its strength, locking the structure together. Higher ageing temperatures would risk over-ageing other parts of the structure, and require expensive post-assembly heat treatment because a high ageing temperature promotes the precipitate to grow too readily.

== Types of hardening ==
There are several ways by which a matrix can be hardened by precipitates, which could also be different for deforming precipitates and non-deforming precipitates.

Deforming particles (weak precipitates):

Coherency hardening occurs when the interface between the particles and the matrix is coherent, which depends on parameters like particle size and the way that particles are introduced. Coherency is where the lattice of the precipitate and that of the matrix are continuous across the interface. Small particles precipitated from supersaturated solid solution usually have coherent interfaces with the matrix. Coherency hardening originates from the atomic volume difference between precipitate and the matrix, which results in a coherency strain. If the atomic volume of the precipitate is smaller, there will be tension because the lattice atoms are located closer than their normal conditions while when the atomic volume of the precipitate is larger, there will be compression of the lattice atoms, as they are further apart than their normal position. Regardless of whether the lattice is under compression or tension, the associated stress field interacts with dislocations leading to decreased dislocation motion either by repulsion or attraction of the dislocations, leading to an increase in yield strength, similar to the size effect in solid solution strengthening. What differentiates this mechanism from solid solution strengthening is the fact that the precipitate has a definite size, not an atom, and therefore a stronger interaction with dislocations.

Modulus hardening results from the different shear modulus of the precipitate and the matrix, which leads to an energy change of dislocation line tension when the dislocation line cuts the precipitate. Also, the dislocation line could bend when entering the precipitate, increasing the affected length of the dislocation line. Again, the strengthening arises in a way similar to that of solid solution strengthening, where there is a mismatch in the lattice that interacts with the dislocations, impeding their motion. Of course, the severity of the interaction is different than that of solid solution and coherency strengthening.

Chemical strengthening is associated with the surface energy of the newly introduced precipitate-matrix interface when the particle is sheared by dislocations. Because it takes energy to make the surface, some of the stress that is causing dislocation motion is accommodated by the additional surfaces. Like modulus hardening, the analysis of interfacial area can be complicated by dislocation line distortion.

Order strengthening occurs when the precipitate is an ordered structure such that bond energy before and after shearing is different. For example, in an ordered cubic crystal with composition AB, the bond energy of A-A and B-B after shearing is higher than that of the A-B bond before. The associated energy increase per unit area is anti-phase boundary energy and accumulates gradually as the dislocation passes through the particle. However, a second dislocation could remove the anti-phase domain left by the first dislocation when traverses the particle. The attraction of the particle and the repulsion of the first dislocation maintains a balanced distance between two dislocations, which makes order strengthening more complicated. Except for when there are very fine particles, this mechanism is generally not as effective as others to strengthen. Another way to consider this mechanism is that when a dislocation shears a particle, the stacking sequence between the new surface made and the matrix is broken, and the bonding is not stable. To get the sequence back into this interface, another dislocation, is needed to shift the stacking. The first and second dislocation are often called a superdislocation. Because superdislocations are required to shear these particles, there is strengthening because of the decreased dislocation motion.

Non-deforming particles (strong precipitate):

In non-deforming particles, where the spacing is small enough or the precipitate-matrix interface is disordered, dislocation bows instead of shears. The strengthening is related to the effective spacing between particles considering finite particle size, but not particle strength, because once the particle is strong enough for the dislocations to bow rather than cut, further increase of the dislocation penetration resistance won't affect strengthening. The main mechanism therefore is Orowan strengthening, where the strong particles do not allow for dislocations to move past. Therefore bowing must occur and in this bowing can cause dislocation loops to build up, which decreases the space available for additional dislocation to bow between. If the dislocations cannot shear particles and cannot move past them, then dislocation motion is successfully impeded.

== Theory ==
The primary species of precipitation strengthening are second phase particles. These particles impede the movement of dislocations throughout the lattice. You can determine whether or not second phase particles will precipitate into solution from the solidus line on the phase diagram for the particles. Physically, this strengthening effect can be attributed both to size and modulus effects, and to interfacial or surface energy.

The presence of second phase particles often causes lattice distortions. These lattice distortions result when the precipitate particles differ in size and crystallographic structure from the host atoms. Smaller precipitate particles in a host lattice leads to a tensile stress, whereas larger precipitate particles leads to a compressive stress. Dislocation defects also create a stress field. Above the dislocation there is a compressive stress and below there is a tensile stress. Consequently, there is a negative interaction energy between a dislocation and a precipitate that each respectively cause a compressive and a tensile stress or vice versa. In other words, the dislocation will be attracted to the precipitate. In addition, there is a positive interaction energy between a dislocation and a precipitate that have the same type of stress field. This means that the dislocation will be repulsed by the precipitate.

Precipitate particles also serve by locally changing the stiffness of a material. Dislocations are repulsed by regions of higher stiffness. Conversely, if the precipitate causes the material to be locally more compliant, then the dislocation will be attracted to that region. In addition, there are three types of interphase boundaries (IPBs).

The first type is a coherent or ordered IPB, the atoms match up one by one along the boundary. Due to the difference in lattice parameters of the two phases, a coherency strain energy is associated with this type of boundary. The second type is a fully disordered IPB and there are no coherency strains, but the particle tends to be non-deforming to dislocations. The last one is a partially ordered IPB, so coherency strains are partially relieved by the periodic introduction of dislocations along the boundary.

In coherent precipitates in a matrix, if the precipitate has a lattice parameter less than that of the matrix, then the atomic match across the IPB leads to an internal stress field that interacts with moving dislocations.

There are two deformation paths, one is the coherency hardening, the lattice mismatch is

$$\varepsilon_{coh} = \frac{a_p - a_m}{a_m}$$
$$\tau _{coh} = 7G\left|\varepsilon_{coh}\right|^\frac{3}{2}\left(\frac{rf}{b}\right)^\frac{1}{2}$$

Where $G$ is the shear modulus, $\varepsilon_{coh}$ is the coherent lattice mismatch, $r$ is the particle radius, $f$ is the particle volume fraction, $b$ is the burgers vector, $rf/b$ equals the concentration.

The other one is modulus hardening. The energy of the dislocation energy is $U_{m}=G_{m}b^2/2$, when it cuts through the precipitate, its energy is $U_{p}=G_{p}b^2/2$, the change in line segment energy is

$$\bigtriangleup{U} = \left(U_{p} - U_{m}\right)2r = \left(G_{p} - G_{m}\right)b^2r$$.

The maximum dislocation length affected is the particle diameter, the line tension change takes place gradually over a distance equal to $r$. The interaction force between the dislocation and the precipitate is

$F = {dU \over dr} = \left(G_{p} - G_{m}\right)b^2 = G_{m}b^2\frac{G_{p} - G_{m}}{G_{m}} = G_{m}b^2\varepsilon_{Gp}$ and $\tau = \frac{F}{bL}$.

Furthermore, a dislocation may cut through a precipitate particle, and introduce more precipitate-matrix interface, which is chemical strengthening. When the dislocation is entering the particle and is within the particle, the upper part of the particle shears b with respect to the lower part accompanies the dislocation entry. A similar process occurs when the dislocation exits the particle. The complete transit is accompanied by creation of matrix-precipitate surface area of approximate magnitude $A = 2\pi rb \,\!$, where r is the radius of the particle and b is the magnitude of the burgers vector. The resulting increase in surface energy is $E = 2\pi rb\gamma_s \,\!$, where $\gamma_{s}$ is the surface energy. The maximum force between the dislocation and particle is $F_{max} = \pi r\gamma_s \,\!$, the corresponding flow stress should be $\Delta\tau=F_{max}/bL=\pi r\gamma_{s}/bL$.

When a particle is sheared by a dislocation, a threshold shear stress is needed to deform the particle. The expression for the required shear stress is as follows:

$$\tau = cG\varepsilon^\frac{3}{2}\left(\frac{rf}{b}\right)^\frac{1}{2}$$

When the precipitate size is small, the required shear stress $\tau$ is proportional to the precipitate size $r^{1/2}$, However, for a fixed particle volume fraction, this stress may decrease at larger values of r owing to an increase in particle spacing. The overall level of the curve is raised by increases in either inherent particle strength or particle volume fraction.

The dislocation can also bow around a precipitate particle through so-called Orowan mechanism.

Since the particle is non-deforming, the dislocation bows around the particles ($\phi_{c}=0$), the stress required to effect the bypassing is inversely proportional to the interparticle spacing $(L-2r)$, that is, $\tau_{b}=Gb/(L-2r)$, where $r$ is the particle radius. Dislocation loops encircle the particles after the bypass operation, a subsequent dislocation would have to be extruded between the loops. Thus, the effective particle spacing for the second dislocation is reduced to $(L-2r')$ with $r' > r$, and the bypassing stress for this dislocation should be $\tau_{b}' = Gb/(L-2r')$, which is greater than for the first one. However, as the radius of particle increases, $L$ will increase so as to maintain the same volume fraction of precipitates, $(L-2r)$ will increase and $\tau_{b}$ will decrease. As a result, the material will become weaker as the precipitate size increases.

For a fixed particle volume fraction, $\tau_{b}$ decreases with increasing r as this is accompanied by an increase in particle spacing.

On the other hand, increasing $f$ increases the level of the stress as a result of a finer particle spacing. The level of $\tau_{b}$ is unaffected by particle strength. That is, once a particle is strong enough to resist cutting, any further increase in its resistance to dislocation penetration has no effect on $\tau_{b}$, which depends only on matrix properties and effective particle spacing.

If particles of A of volume fraction $f_{1}$ are dispersed in a matrix, particles are sheared for $r<r_{c1}$ and are bypassed for $r>r_{c1}$, maximum strength is obtained at $r=r_{c1}$, where the cutting and bowing stresses are equal. If inherently harder particles of B of the same volume fraction are present, the level of the $\tau_{c}$ curve is increased but that of the $\tau_{b}$ one is not. Maximum hardening, greater than that for A particles, is found at $r_{c2}<r_{c1}$. Increasing the volume fraction of A raises the level of both $\tau_{b}$ and $\tau_{c}$ and increases the maximum strength obtained. The latter is found at $r_{c3}$, which may be either less than or greater than $r_{c1}$ depending on the shape of the $\tau-r$ curve.

== Governing equations ==
There are two main types of equations to describe the two mechanisms for precipitation hardening based on weak and strong precipitates. Weak precipitates can be sheared by dislocations while strong precipitates cannot, and therefore the dislocation must bow. First, it is important to consider the difference between these two different mechanisms in terms of the dislocation line tension that they make. The line tension balance equation is:

$$\tau \cong \frac{Gb}{L'}cos(\frac{\phi_c}{2})$$

Where $\phi_c$ is the radius of the dislocation at a certain stress. Strong obstacles have small $\phi_c$ due to the bowing of the dislocation. Still, decreasing obstacle strength will increase the $\phi_c$ and must be included in the calculation. L' is also equal to the effective spacing between obstacles L. This leaves an equation for strong obstacles:

$$\tau_{strong} \cong \frac{Gb}{L}cos(\frac{\phi_c}{2})$$

Considering weak particles, $\phi_c$ should be nearing $180^\circ$ due to the dislocation line staying relatively straight through obstacles. Also, L' will be:

$$L'_{weak} = \frac{L}{cos(\frac{\phi_c}{2})}$$

which states the weak particle equation:

$$\tau_{weak} \cong \frac{Gb}{L}cos(\frac{\phi_c}{2})$$

Now, consider the mechanisms for each regime:

Dislocation cutting through particles: For most strengthening at the early stage, it increases with $\epsilon^\tfrac 3 2 (fr/b)^\tfrac 1 2$, where $\epsilon$ is a dimensionless mismatch parameter (for example, in coherency hardening, $\epsilon$ is the fractional change of precipitate and matrix lattice parameter), $f$ is the volume fraction of precipitate, $r$ is the precipitate radius, and $b$ is the magnitude of the Burgers vector. According to this relationship, materials strength increases with increasing mismatch, volume fraction, and particle size, so that dislocation is easier to cut through particles with smaller radius.

For different types of hardening through cutting, governing equations are as following.

For coherency hardening,

$\tau_{coh} = 7G\left|\epsilon_{coh}\right|^\frac{3}{2} (fr/b)^\frac{1}{2}$,

$\epsilon_{coh} = (a_p-a_m)/a_m$,

where $\tau$ is increased shear stress, $G$ is the shear modulus of the matrix, $a_p$ and $a_m$ are the lattice parameter of the precipitate or the matrix.

For modulus hardening,

$\tau_{G_p} = 0.01G\epsilon_{G_p}^\frac{3}{2} (fr/b)^\frac{1}{2}$,

$\epsilon_{G_p} = \left(G_p-G_m\right)/G_m$,

where $G_p$ and $G_m$ are the shear modulus of the precipitate or the matrix.

For chemical strengthening,

$\tau_{chem} = 2G\epsilon_{ch}^\frac{3}{2} (fr/b)^\frac{1}{2}$,

$\epsilon_{ch}=\gamma_s/Gr$,

where $\gamma_s$ is the particle-matrix interphase surface energy.

Dislocation particle cutting and bowing/looping

For order strengthening,

$\tau_{ord} = 0.7G\epsilon_{ord}^\frac{3}{2} (fr/b)^\frac{1}{2}$

(low $\epsilon_{ord}$, early stage precipitation), where the dislocations are widely separated;

$\tau_{ord} = 0.7G\left(\epsilon_{ord}^\tfrac 3 2 (fr/b)^\tfrac 1 2 - 0.7\epsilon_{ord}f\right)$

(high $\epsilon_{ord}$, early stage precipitation), where the dislocations are not widely separated; $\epsilon_{ord} = \frac{APBE_s}{Gb}$, where $APBE_s$ is anti-phase boundary energy.

Dislocations bowing around particles: When the precipitate is strong enough to resist dislocation penetration, dislocation bows and the maximum stress is given by the Orowan equation. Dislocation bowing, also called Orowan strengthening, is more likely to occur when the particle density in the material is lower.

$$\tau = \frac{Gb}{L-2r} \,\!$$

where $\tau$ is the material strength, $G$ is the shear modulus, $b$ is the magnitude of the Burgers vector, $L$ is the distance between pinning points, and $r$ is the second phase particle radius. This governing equation shows that for dislocation bowing the strength is inversely proportional to the second phase particle radius $r$, because when the volume fraction of the precipitate is fixed, the spacing $L$ between particles increases concurrently with the particle radius $r$, therefore $L-2r$ increases with $r$.

These governing equations show that the precipitation hardening mechanism depends on the size of the precipitate particles. At small $r$, cutting will dominate, while at large $r$, bowing will dominate.

Looking at the plot of both equations, it is clear that there is a critical radius at which max strengthening occurs. This critical radius is typically 5-30 nm.

The Orowan strengthening model above neglects changes to the dislocations due to the bending. If bowing is accounted for, and the instability condition in the Frank-Read mechanism is assumed, the critical stress for dislocations bowing between pinning segments can be described as:

$\tau_c = A(\theta)\frac{Gb}{2\pi L^'}ln\left(\frac{L^'}{r}\right)$

where $A$ is a function of $\theta$, $\theta$ is the angle between the dislocation line and the Burgers vector, $L^'$ is the effective particle separation, $b$ is the Burgers vector, and $r$ is the particle radius.

== Other Considerations ==
Grain Size Control

Precipitates in a polycrystalline material can act as grain refiners if they are nucleated or located near grain boundaries, where they pin the grain boundaries as an alloy is solidifying and do not allow for a coarse microstructure. This is helpful, as finer microstructures often outperform (mechanical properties) coarser ones at room temperatures. In recent times nano-precipitates are being studied under creep conditions. These precipitates can also pin the grain boundary at higher temperatures, essentially acting as "friction". Another useful effect can be to impede grain-boundary sliding under diffusional creep conditions with very fine precipitates and if the precipitates are homogeneously dispersed in the matrix, then these same precipitates in the grains might interact with dislocations under creep dislocation creep conditions.

Secondary Precipitates

Different precipitates, depending on their elemental compositions, can form under certain aging conditions that were not previously there. Secondary precipitates can arise from removing solutes from the matrix solid solution states. The control of this can be exploited to control the microstructure and influence properties.

== Computational discovery of new alloys ==
While significant effort has been made to develop new alloys, the experimental results take time and money to be implemented. One possible alternative is doing simulations with Density functional theory, that can take advantage of, in the context of precipitation hardening, the crystalline structure of precipitates and of the matrix and allow the exploration of a lot more alternatives than with experiments in the traditional form.

One strategy for doing these simulations is focusing on the ordered structures that can be found in many metal alloys, like the long-period stacking ordered (LPSO) structures that have been observed in numerous systems. The LPSO structure is long packed layered configuration along one axis with some layers enriched with precipitated elements. This allows to exploit the symmetry of the supercells and it suits well with the currently available DFT methods.

In this way, some researchers have developed strategies to screen the possible strengthening precipitates that allow decreasing the weight of some metal alloys. For example, Mg-alloys have received progressive interest to replace Aluminum and Steel in the vehicle industry because it is one of the lighter structural metals. However, Mg-alloys show issues with low strength and ductility which have limited their use. To overcome this, the Precipitation hardening technique, through the addition of rare earth elements, has been used to improve the alloy strength and ductility. Specifically, the LPSO structures were found that are responsible for these increments, generating an Mg-alloy that exhibited high-yield strength: 610 MPa at 5% of elongation at room temperature.

In this way, some researchers have developed strategies to looking for cheaper alternatives than Rare Elements (RE) it was simulated a ternary system with Mg-Xl-Xs, where Xl and Xs correspond to atoms larger than and shorter than Mg, respectively. Under this study, it was confirmed more than 85 Mg-Re-Xs LPSO structures, showing the DFT ability to predict known LPSO ternary structures. Then they explore the 11 non-RE Xl elements and was found that 4 of them are thermodynamically stable. One of them is the Mg-Ca-Zn system that is predicted to form an LPSO structure.

Following the previous DFT predictions, other investigators made experiments with the Mg-Zn-Y-Mn-Ca system and found that at 0.34%at Ca addition the mechanical properties of the system were enhanced due to the formation of LPSO-structures, achieving "a good balance of the strength and ductibility".

== Examples of precipitation hardening materials ==
- 2000-series aluminium alloys (important examples: 2024 and 2019, also Y alloy and Hiduminium)
- 6000-series aluminium alloys (important example: 6061 for bicycle frames and aeronautical structures)
- 7000-series aluminium alloys (important examples: 7075 and 7475)
- 17-4 stainless steel (UNS S17400)
- Maraging steel
- Inconel 718
- Alloy X-750
- René 41
- Waspaloy
- Mulberry (uranium alloy)
- NAK55 Low Carbon Steel

== See also ==
- Alfred Wilm
- Strength of materials
- Strengthening mechanisms of materials
- Metallurgy
- Superalloy
- 475 °C embrittlement
