= Iron aluminide =

Compounds of iron and aluminium

Iron aluminides are intermetallic compounds of iron and aluminium - they typically contain ~18% Al or more.

Good oxide and sulfur resistance, with strength comparable to steel alloys, and low cost of materials have made these compounds of metallurgical interest - however low ductility and issues with hydrogen embrittlement are barriers to their processing and use in structural applications.

== Overview ==
High corrosion resistance of iron alloys containing more than 18% aluminium was first noted in the 1930s. Their tensile strength compares favorably with steels, whilst utilizing only common elements; however they have low ductility at room temperature, and strength drops off substantially over 600 °C. The alloys also have good sulfide and oxidation resistance, good wear resistance, and lower density than steels. Peak strength and hardness is reached at the Fe_{3}Al stoichiometric region. Although Al gives corrosion resistance via an oxide film surface, reaction (with water) may also give rise to embrittlement via hydrogen produced in the reaction between Al and H_{2}O.

Chromium (2-6%) improves room temperature ductility. In 1996, Kamey said the mechanism was not fully understood, but offered a hypothesis that it could reduce hydrogen embrittlement via its ability to stabilise the FeAl phase. Other explanations have included that chromium could facilitate slipping via crystal dislocations, and that it could contribute to surface passivation and prevent embrittling water reactions. A disordered alloy (designated FAPY) containing ~16% Al, ~5.4% Cr plus ~0.1% Zr, C, and Y, with ~1% Mo showed much improved ductility, only dropping substantially under ~200C (cf 650C for Fe_{3}Al); this alloy also is cold workable.

=== Phases ===
Below ~18-20% (atomic) Al the aluminium exists as a solid solution in iron. Above this concentration there are FeAl (B2 phase) and Fe_{3}Al (DO_{3} phase) existing in the form of caesium chloride (CsCl) and α-bismuth trifluoride (BiF_{3}) crystal structures. Above ~550 °C the Fe_{3}Al phase is transformed in FeAl (and Fe).

Above ~50% Al (atomic) Fe_{5}Al_{8}, FeAl_{2}, Fe_{2}Al_{5}, and Fe_{4}Al_{13} are also known - the Al rich phases show high brittleness.

=== Preparation ===
The reaction between Al and Fe to generate iron aluminide is exothermic. Production from direct melting of Al and Fe is economical, but any water in the charge produces issues with the generation of hydrogen which shows solubility in the iron aluminide, leading to gas voids. Blowing with argon or vacuum melting alleviates this.

Large grain size is greatly deleterious to ductility, especially with Fe_{3}Al, and is encountered in cast iron aluminides.

Coatings of iron aluminide can be prepared by chemical vapor deposition onto iron.

=== Creep resistance ===
The high corrosion resistance of FeAl alloys make them desirable for high temperature applications in corrosive environments. However, FeAl alloys have intrinsically low creep strength at high temperatures because of the high diffusivity of the B2 structure. In order to be used as a high temperature alloy, FeAl must be treated to increase its creep resistance. The two most common methods to increase the creep resistance of FeAl are solid solution strengthening and precipitation hardening.

Solid solution strengthening was shown to decrease the steady state creep rate and the power law exponent of FeAl by increasing the concentration of other transition metals in a FeAl alloy. While this did increase the creep strength of the material, it is still limited by the ductility of FeAl, as the strengthened alloy fractured after just 0.3% strain.

Precipitation hardening in FeAl is commonly achieved with two different types of precipitates: oxide particles and carbides. 5 nm Y based oxide particles have been shown to increase the creep resistance of FeAl at temperatures up to 800C. Similarly, Ti based carbides have been shown to have high creep resistance at low stresses, consistent with the precipitation strengthening mechanism. While precipitation strengthening is excellent at increasing creep resistance, the stability of the precipitates at high temperatures is a limiting factor. Carbides can be dissolved into the FeAl and oxide particles can coarsen at temperatures over 1000C. As a result, FeAl alloys have not been effectively strengthened for applications that require temperatures higher than 1000C and different strategies will be needed to further increase the possible operating temperature.

== Uses ==
Potential uses for iron alumides include: electrical heating elements, piping and other work for high temperature process including piping for coal gasification and for superheater and re-heater tubes. It has also been suggested as a structural material for lunar use. Thanks to the good combination of mechanical and oxidation properties, iron aluminide has been successfully used as a binder phase for tungsten carbides. Also, replacing Cobalt in conventional WC-Co cermets with FeAl in the Laser cladding process caused improving oxidation and wear properties.
