= Aluminide =

Inorganic compound group

Aluminides are intermetallic compounds of aluminium. Since aluminium is near the nonmetals on the periodic table, it can bond with metals differently than other metals. The properties of an aluminide are between those of a metal alloy and those of an ionic compound. Aluminides are used as bond coats in thermal barrier coating systems.

== Examples ==
- Magnesium aluminide, MgAl
- Titanium aluminide, TiAl
- Iron aluminides, including Fe_{3}Al and FeAl
- Nickel aluminide, Ni_{3}Al

See Category:Aluminides for a list.
