= Titanium aluminide =

Intermetallic chemical compound

Names
- IUPAC name Titanium Aluminide

Identifiers
3D model (JSmol)	Interactive image; Interactive image; Interactive image
ChemSpider	8466204; 115295645; 4891845
PubChem CID	10290735; 78062297; 6336852
- InChI: InChI=1S/Al.Ti Key: KHEQKSIHRDRLMG-UHFFFAOYSA-N; InChI=1S/Al.3Ti; InChI=1S/3Al.Ti
- SMILES: [Al].[Ti]; [Al].[Ti].[Ti].[Ti]; [Al].[Al].[Al].[Ti]

Properties
Chemical formula	AlTi
Molar mass	74.849 g/mol

Properties
Chemical formula	AlTi_{3}
Molar mass	170.58 g/mol

Properties
Chemical formula	Al_{3}Ti
Molar mass	128.812 g/mol
- Except where otherwise noted, data are given for materials in their standard state (at 25 °C [77 °F], 100 kPa). Infobox references

Titanium aluminide (chemical formula AlTi), commonly gamma titanium, is an intermetallic chemical compound. It is lightweight and resistant to oxidation and heat, but has low ductility. The density of γ-TiAl is about 4.0 g/cm^{3} (0.14 lb/cu in). It finds use in several applications including aircraft, jet engines, sporting equipment, and automobiles. The development of TiAl based alloys began circa 1970. The alloys have been used in these applications only since about 2000.

Titanium aluminide has three major intermetallic compounds: gamma titanium aluminide (gamma TiAl, γ-TiAl), alpha 2-Ti_{3}Al and TiAl_{3}. Among the three, gamma TiAl has received the most interest and applications.

== Applications of gamma-TiAl ==
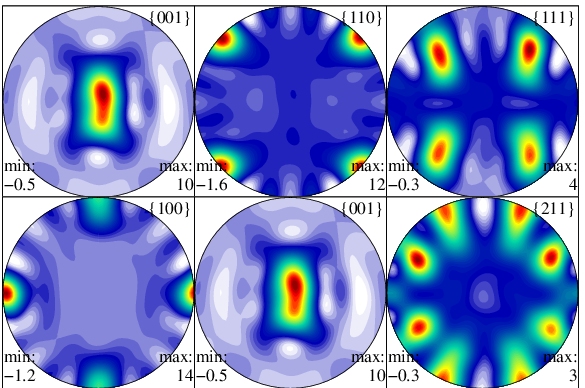
Pole figures displaying crystallographic texture of gamma-TiAl in a rolled sheet of alpha2-gamma alloy, as measured by high energy X-rays.

Gamma TiAl has excellent mechanical properties and oxidation and corrosion resistance at elevated temperatures (over 600 °C (1,112 °F; 873 K)), which makes it a possible replacement for traditional Ni based superalloy components in aircraft turbine engines.

TiAl-based alloys have potential to increase the thrust-to-weight ratio in aircraft engines. This is especially the case with the engine's low-pressure turbine blades and the high-pressure compressor blades. These are traditionally made of Ni-based superalloy, which is nearly twice as dense as TiAl-based alloys. Some gamma titanium aluminide alloys retain strength and oxidation resistance to 1,000 °C (1,830 °F; 1,270 K), which is 400 °C (752 °F; 673 K) higher than the operating temperature limit of conventional titanium alloys.

General Electric uses gamma TiAl for the low-pressure turbine blades on its GEnx engine, which powers the Boeing 787 and Boeing 747-8 aircraft. This was the first large-scale use of this material on a commercial jet engine when it entered service in 2011. The TiAl LPT blades are cast by Precision Castparts Corp. and Avio s.p.a. Machining of the Stage 6, and Stage 7 LPT blades is performed by Moeller Manufacturing. An alternate pathway for production of the gamma TiAl blades for the GEnx and GE9x engines using additive manufacturing is being explored.

== Alpha 2-Ti_{3}Al ==
Alpha 2-Ti_{3}Al is an intermetallic compound of titanium and aluminum, belonging to the Ti-Al system of advanced high-temperature materials. It is primarily used in aerospace and other high-performance applications due to its balance of strength, lightweight properties, and oxidation resistance.

It has an ordered hexagonal (D0_{19}) crystal structure, which makes it distinct from the more commonly known γ-TiAl (gamma titanium aluminide).

== TiAl_{3} ==
TiAl_{3} has the lowest density of 3.4 g/cm^{3} (0.12 lb/cu in), the highest micro hardness of 465–670 kg/mm^{2} (661,000–953,000 lbf/in^{2}) and the best oxidation resistance even at 1,000 °C (1,830 °F; 1,270 K). However, the applications of TiAl_{3} in the engineering and aerospace fields are limited by its poor ductility. In addition, the loss of ductility at ambient temperature is usually accompanied by a change of fracture mode from ductile transgranular to brittle intergranular or to brittle cleavage. Despite the fact that a lot of strategies have been developed to improve fracture toughness, machining quality is still a difficult problem to tackle. Near-net shape manufacturing technology is considered as one of the best choices for preparing such materials.
