= René 41 =

Nickel-based high temperature, high strength alloy

René 41 is a nickel-based high temperature alloy developed by General Electric. It retains high strength in the 600–1,000 °C (1,200–1,800 °F) temperature range. It is used in jet engine and missile components, and other applications that require high strength at extreme temperatures. René 41 is considered a nickel alloy based upon its chemical composition.

	Cr	Ni	Mo	Co	Al	Ti	B	C	Fe	Mn	Si	S	Cu
Min	18.00%	Balance	9.00%	10.00%	1.40%	3.00%	0.003%	0.06%	--	--	--	--	--
Max	20.00%	Balance	10.50%	12.00%	1.80%	3.30%	0.01%	0.12%	5.00%	0.10%	0.50%	0.015%	0.50%

René 41 was used to create the outer shell of the Mercury space capsule, due to its ability to retain high strength at very high temperatures.
