= Fulmer Research Institute =

British research and development organization

Coordinates: 51°32′53″N 0°34′41″W

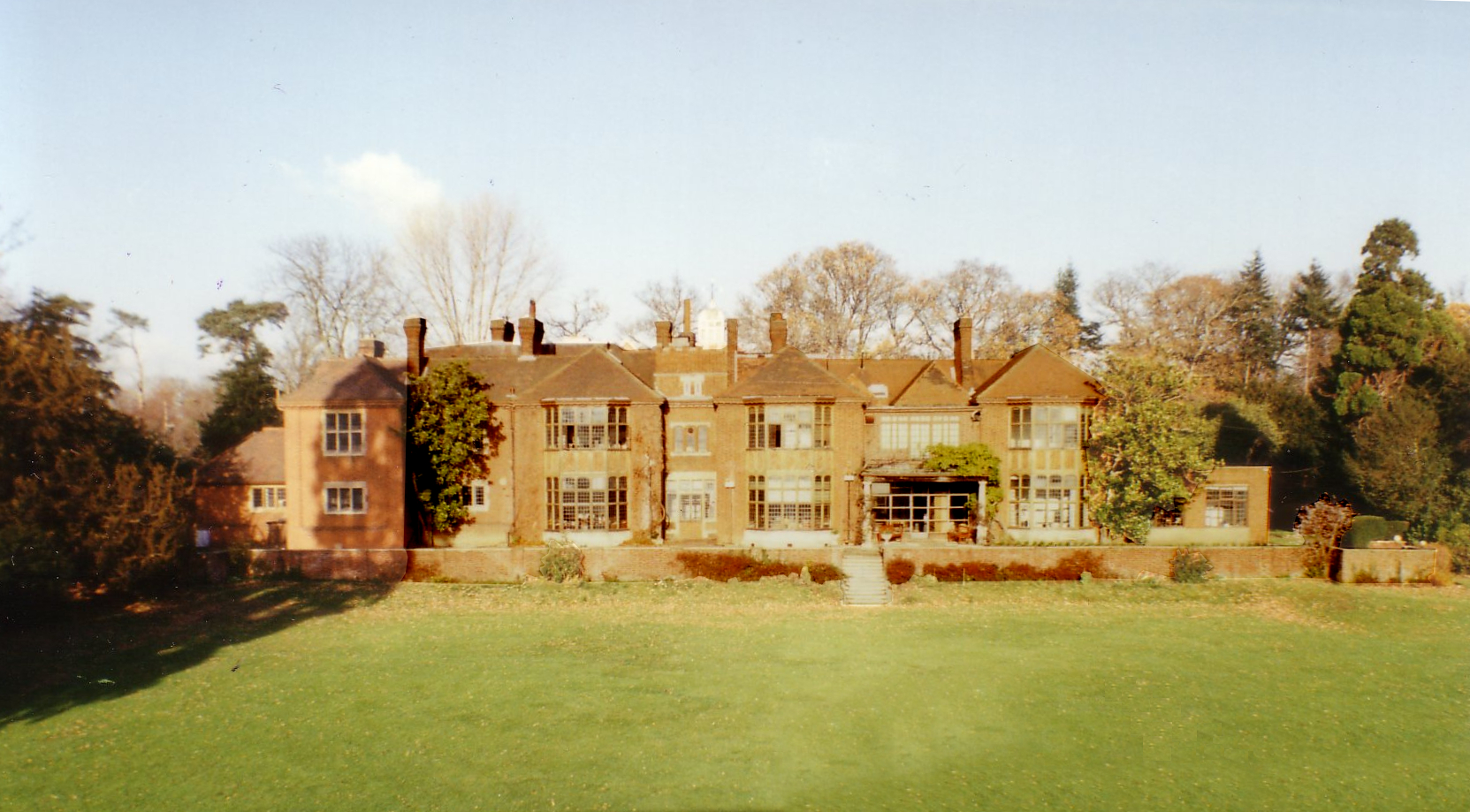
- Type: Private Limited Company
- Industry: Technical and scientific services in materials technology and related fields
- Founded: Stoke Poges, Buckinghamshire (1945)
- Founder: Col W C (Dev) Devereux
- Successors: Parts acquired in 1990 by: BNF Metals Technology Centre; Societe Generale de Surveillance S.A.; Sintek
- Headquarters: United Kingdom
- Key people: E A G (Ted) Liddiard, Director of Research 1945 - May 1969; W Eric Duckworth, Director of Research June 1969 - 1990
- Products: Research & Development; Testing; Consultancy; Certification

Fulmer Research Institute was founded in 1945 as a UK contract research and development organization specializing in materials technology and related areas of physics and chemistry. It was modelled on American contract research companies such as Battelle Memorial Institute and The Mellon Institute of Industrial Research. In 1965 it was acquired by The Institute of Physics and the Physical Society, a rare case of a contract research company being owned by a Learned Society. Through the 1970s and 80s Fulmer evolved. Its services in testing, consultancy and certification were greatly strengthened while academic research declined. It continued to make important developments and innovations for industry and government until in 1990 it was split up and sold to other R & D and testing organizations.

A few of the landmark achievements during its forty five years were:

- The extraction of aluminium using sub-halide sublimation
- Aluminium-tin and aluminium-lead alloys for plain-bearings
- Chemical Vapour Deposition of metals and ceramics to produce coatings, tubes, crucibles etc.
- Fundamental research into aluminium copper alloys, leading to high strength formulations for the skin of high performance aircraft
- YQAF, a subsidiary company authorised to assess and accredit organizations to quality standards.

== Origins (1945 and 1946) ==
Fulmer Research Institute was founded in 1945 by Col W C (Dev) Devereux and incorporated in 1946. He had been a pioneer in the use of light metal alloys in aero engines and, in the Second World War, he had an important role in the UK Ministry of Aircraft Production, organizing the assembly in Britain of American aircraft and reorganizing the repair of aircraft and aero-engines.

After the war, in 1945, he set up a company called Almin Ltd (Associated Light Metal Industries) which brought together a group of companies mostly concerned with the production and processing of aluminium and magnesium alloys. He wanted Almin to have research facilities but he recognised that Almin's R&D needs alone were not sufficient to justify the investment in staff and capital equipment required for properly equipped laboratories. His answer was to establish a contract research organization (Note: The term "Contract Research Organization" is used in this article in the wide sense in which projects and services can be in any scientific or technological field. This was the common usage during the period covered by the article. More recently Contract Research Organization has come to be used in a narrower sense, restricted to companies that serve the medical and pharmaceutical sector. Several roughly equivaivalent terms such as "Innovation (or Intermediate) Research and Technology Organization" (IRTO) are now often used for the wider sense of CRO. See for example AIRTO (the successor organization to AICRO).) along the lines of Battelle Memorial Institute and The Mellon Institute of Industrial Research in the USA.

Thus he founded Fulmer Research Institute as one of the first contract research companies in Britain. Initially it was in temporary accommodation but he soon found a permanent base by purchasing a large Edwardian country house with ten acres of grounds, in the Buckinghamshire village of Stoke Poges. The name 'Fulmer' was the name of the local telephone exchange and that of a nearby village.

=== Building the team ===
Devereux recruited Ted Liddiard from The British Non-Ferrous Metals Research Association (BNF) to be Fulmer's director of research

Among other senior staff recruited were:

- Philipp Gross a refugee from Vienna who was an expert in chemical thermodynamics and had been working at International Alloys (another Almin company) on the direct reduction of magnesite to magnesium, appointed principal scientist
- Ted Calnan, appointed principal physicist
- Arthur Sully, recruited from Special Metals Wiggin Limited, was an expert on the creep of jet engine turbine blades. He established Fulmer's reputation in physical metallurgy
- Harold Hardy, another metallurgist, worked on the development of new aluminium alloys
- Gordon Metcalfe, recruited from the Royal Aircraft Establishment to head the corrosion section
- Tom Heal, a physicist who had served in the Navy working on counter measures against acoustic and magnetic mines, became head of physics
- Eric Brandes, a process metallurgist from the Ford Motor Company
- Leon Levi, a physical chemist

By the end of 1946 Fulmer had about 40 Staff.

=== Policy ===
From the start Fulmer was a commercial enterprise aiming to make a surplus for investment in its own development. It received no grant or membership fees. Its income was solely from projects, each with defined objectives and time and cost limits agreed with individual sponsors from Government or Industry. Normally, the project contract would provide that all results would belong in confidence to the sponsor, who would also own any patents arising from the investigation.

== Early years (1946 to 1960) ==
=== Context ===
Fulmer benefited from the immediate post-war climate which was favourable to Research and Development. The UK Government and its agencies continued to spend heavily on R&D. This was despite the fact that Britain was essentially bankrupt and hugely indebted to the United States and Canada. The technological advances which had been made on both sides of the conflict had been impressive: radar, the jet engine, the V-2 rocket and the atomic bomb are just a few examples. The Cold War soon added urgency to further military development and there was enthusiasm for developing peaceful uses of atomic energy.

=== Market ===
In the years up to 1960 the following approximate division of Fulmer's income applied: about 25% of project work was for UK Government defence agencies; 25% for the Atomic Energy Authority and another 10% for other Government agencies. About 10% was for US Government agencies (the US Air Force and the Office of Aerospace Research); 30% was for British Industry.

=== Growth ===
Fulmer grew steadily so that by 1960 there were about 100 staff. Individual research investigators were often recruited to work on specific projects as contracts were obtained. Each recruit was also expected to develop proposals for work in his or her areas of expertise, whether or not these fitted into Fulmer's existing pattern of work. This system resulted in a progressive evolution and wide diversification of Fulmer's skills base. This was a strength in that faced with a materials problem Fulmer could usually help the client with new perspectives.

=== Some notable projects and activities 1946 to 1960 ===
- Phase diagram determination for the aluminium-copper age-hardening alloy system. This was to lead to further discoveries at Fulmer on the influence of trace elements on nucleation and grain growth. Fulmer used this to formulate and patent alloys with high strength and toughness and good creep resistance for the skins of high-performance aircraft.
- The sub-halide catalytic distillation method for primary aluminium production. Dr Gross began this work at International Alloys and, when Fulmer was founded, this became Fulmer's first contract. He speculated and then proved that aluminium has a subhalide AlCl. He devised a method by which pure aluminium can be catalytically distilled from any aluminium-containing alloy or mixture or from scrap aluminium using the following reversible reaction:

2Al(solid) + AlCl_{3}(gas) $\ce{\rightleftharpoons}$ 3AlCl(gas)

The forward reaction is favoured at high temperature and low partial pressure of AlCl_{3}. On cooling, the reaction reverses; aluminium condenses and the trichloride can be recirculated. Analogous methods were developed for the extraction of beryllium and titanium.

- Determination of thermodynamic data by high accuracy calorimetry. Heats of formation and free energies of formation were needed for the assessment of potential rocket fuels. Fulmer established equipment and skills for very accurate measurement of heats of formation and heats of reaction. Reaction conditions could be extreme: burning in fluorine might have to be contained or temperatures up to 2000 °C might be needed. Calorimeter fluid temperatures were measured to 2×10^{−4} K. Over the many years that this work continued, Fulmer established thermodynamic data for a wide range of metal halides, intermetallics, mixed oxides and other compounds.
- Aluminium-tin alloys for plain bearing shells. Fulmer's researchers applied to the aluminum-tin alloy system the fundamental work of C S Smith on the relationship of interfacial energy and microstructure. They established a process of cold work and recrystallization which converts the weak as-cast structure, in which aluminium grains are surrounded by tin, to one in which tin is dispersed in a strong aluminium matrix. The aluminium provides the load-bearing required for a plain bearing while the tin gives the required bearing properties. For many years these aluminium-tin bearings were used in most diesel engines and they are still in current use.
- X-ray diffraction crystallography of metals and alloys for phase diagram determination.
- Interfacial tension and wetting behaviour of liquid sodium.
- Vitreous enamelling of aluminium to give high integrity electrically resistant coatings.
- Measurements of stress corrosion and corrosion fatigue of light alloys.
- Studies of deformation processes in difficult metals such as beryllium and chromium.

== Impalco ownership (1960 to 1964) ==
In 1960 Almin was bought by Imperial Aluminium Company (Impalco), a company formed between the Aluminium Company of America (Alcoa) and Imperial Chemical Industries (ICI) which incorporated the whole of ICI's aluminium facilities. Impalco's primary interest in buying Almin was to acquire the facilities of International Alloys, a member of the Almin group. Thus Fulmer was acquired incidentally and it did not fit easily into the Impalco group. Since Impalco had huge research facilities in-house, it had no need of Fulmer's services. Impalco's rival companies were also reluctant to place large contracts with Fulmer under this ownership.

=== Context ===
As a background to this change of ownership, the general climate for science and technology was becoming less favourable. Faith in scientific and technological solutions was diminished by some spectacular failures: the de Havilland Comet suffered catastrophic in-flight failures; thalidomide caused tragic birth defects. Government procurement projects were frequently out of control: the BAC TSR-2 was cancelled after enormous overspend in development and only 24 test flights; the de Havilland Blue Streak missile was also abandoned in 1960 after great expense. With Government budgets under severe pressure, contracts from government agencies were becoming harder to obtain,

Thus most of Fulmer's markets were becoming difficult and Fulmer's long term viability was in doubt.

=== Some notable projects and activities 1960 to 1964 ===
- Measurement of the emissivities of gases at temperatures up to 1000 °C. Emissivity values were required for gaseous aluminium chlorides as part of the development of the sub-halide distillation process mentioned above. A flowing column of the gas to be measured, heated in a refractory tube, was maintained at a fixed length by gas barriers at each end, formed by balanced opposing streams of argon. The radiation emitted by the gas was measured by a thermopile. A diaphragm was set up to shield this sensor from radiation emitted by the furnace and other hot parts of the equipment. The whole apparatus was mounted on a water-cooled optical bench.
- X-ray diffraction determination of the structures of liquid metals. There was a need for structural studies of liquid sodium and sodium-potassium alloys because these were used as coolants in fast-breeder reactors. Fulmer developed a high temperature x-ray diffractometer for investigating the structures of liquid metals and alloys. In addition to its studies of liquid alkali metals, Fulmer discovered that certain eutectics, such as those in the gold-silicon and gold-germanium systems, have a structure in the liquid phase that has to be disrupted on crystallization. This gives rise to considerable supercooling which results in multiple nucleation, and hence a very fine grain size in the resulting polycrystalline alloy.
- Production of high purity austenitic stainless steel. High purity austenitic stainless steel was of interest as a potential cladding material for nuclear fuel elements. Fulmer produced high purity chromium by electro-deposition from a fluoride bath. Zone refining using induction heating was used to produce high-purity iron and nickel and to remove oxygen from chromium. Impurity levels of 1-40 parts per million were achieved.
- Chromium with improved ductility. Uses of chromium as a high temperature material are limited by its brittleness. Starting with electro-deposited flakes of high purity chromium, investigators at Fulmer used argon-arc melting to form electrodes for ingot production in a consumable electrode furnace. Ingots were then heated in an inert or hydrogen atmosphere and extruded to give a fine grained structure. Critical warm working, below the recrystallization temperature, then gave improved room-temperature ductility.
- Statistical studies of the strength of ceramics. The strength of brittle materials such as ceramics is inherently variable. Fulmer undertook numerous strength tests on sets of nominally identical specimens of engineering ceramics such as silicon nitride and silicon carbide. They devised graphical techniques for finding the probability distribution of test results and contributed to criteria for engineering design with these materials.

== The Institute of Physics period (1965 to 1990) ==
In 1964 Impalco decided to offer Fulmer for sale.

At that time Dr (later Sir) James Taylor, who was Chairman of Imperial Metal Industries (IMI), was also the Honorary Treasurer of the Institute of Physics and the Physical Society (IOP). (Note: In 1970 The Institute of Physics and the Physical Society renamed itself to The Institute of Physics.) He proposed that IOP should acquire Fulmer and thus become the first Learned Society to own a commercial research company. The Council of the IOP, in recommending the purchase of Fulmer to its membership, expressed the intention that, after providing for equipment needs, income from the investment in Fulmer was to be used to support the scientific and educational work of the IOP. The purchase was made possible by a grant from ICI, to be repaid over ten years from Fulmer profits. Thus, in 1965, IOP became the owner of Fulmer.

=== 1965 to 1970 ===
With its future thus assured, in 1966 additional laboratories in a new building were opened on the Stoke Poges site. Also in that year Fulmer strengthened its expertise, particularly in electron metallography, by recruiting several key staff who transferred from Aeon Laboratories of Egham, Surrey.

In 1969 Mr Liddiard retired as director of research and Dr W E Duckworth was recruited from the British Iron and Steel Research Association and appointed in his place.

In 1970 Fulmer set up a new unit, Fulmer Technical Services (FTS), to provide a focus for its testing and consultancy services to industry.

During this period there was a gradual increase in income and a modest profit while staff numbers remained at about 120.

=== Context ===
By the early 1970s the climate for R&D was again changing. Government R&D budgets continued to tighten. The earlier pattern of Fulmer sponsorship, with a large proportion of contracts from UK ministries and government agencies, no longer applied. In 1955 this proportion had been 70% but by 1970 it had fallen to 45%. By 1985 it was to become less than 5%. Meanwhile, contract R&D was becoming a familiar concept in the UK. Following Fulmer, many other contract R&D companies had been formed, important examples being Huntingdon Life Sciences(1957) and Cambridge Consultants(1960). This gave Fulmer opportunities for collaboration but also increased competition. Fulmer promoted contract R&D by publishing Register of Consulting Scientists and Contract Research Organizations.

In 1971 Lord Rothschild published his report on Government R&D in which a major recommendation was that "applied R&D ... must be done on a customer-contractor basis. The customer says what he wants; the contractor does it (if he can); and the customer pays".

Despite Rothschild's recommendations, government procurement was slow to change. By 1975, leading independent research companies felt that they were not getting a fair share of government R&D contracts and needed a stronger voice. Fulmer joined with six other companies in setting up the Association of Independent Contract Research Organizations (AICRO). (Note: The other founder members of AICRO were: Huntingdon Research Centre, Inveresk Research International, Ricardo Consulting Engineers, Robertson Research International, International Research and Development and Electrical Research Association (then no longer a Research Association).)

The journal New Scientist published a special supplement on Contract Research in 1974

There were two major developments that intensified competition in Fulmer's market. Firstly, organizations such as Harwell, which had been fully government funded, were seeking contracts from industry to make good their declining government income. Secondly by 1969, following the Robbins Report(1963) on higher education, nine completely new universities had been founded and the ten existing Colleges of Advanced Technology had been converted into full universities. Robbins found that in the existing universities, teachers spent a third of their time on teaching and rather less than a third on research. He recommended that "The balance between teaching and research in the universities should in general be maintained." The net effect was a huge expansion of R&D facilities in universities, funded by their block grants, and they were naturally keen to supplement their incomes with contracts using these facilities.

=== Policy ===
In response to these market changes Eric Duckworth initiated changes of policy. Fulmer sought to extend its services to include the full range from R&D and testing to small scale manufacture, to extend its area of expertise to cover a wider range of materials and to develop new markets. It sought to collaborate with or to acquire organisations with complementary skills and facilities. The aim was to be able to offer to industrial companies a comprehensive service in all aspects of materials technology. Fulmer also changed its policy on intellectual property. Previously patents were applied for as part of sponsored projects so that all rights belonged to the sponsor. Beginning in 1970, the policy also included the patenting of worthwhile ideas developed in-house before applying for sponsorship so that Fulmer could retain rights and benefit from subsequent exploitation. Another new approach was to launch projects in which a number of clients jointly sponsored a development (multi-client projects).

There was also a change of management style. Early in his career Eric Duckworth had spent ten years at the Glacier Metal Company at the time when the Glacier Project - a pioneering new approach to management-staff relations - was being developed there by Wilfred (later Lord) Brown, the managing director, and Elliott Jaques of the Tavistock Institute of Human Relations. When he joined Fulmer Eric Duckworth introduced a style of management heavily influenced by his experience of the Glacier Project. Over time this evolved into an open style with features such as a company council with representatives from all staff, regular management briefing of staff and transparent grading and pay scales against which individual staff were appraised annually. The grading system enabled parity of career progression between managers and people who focussed on developing their technical expertise.

=== Growth by acquisition 1973 to 1977 ===
The first and most important of the complementary organizations to link with Fulmer was Yarsley, whose expertise was particularly strong in plastics and polymers and their applications. The Yarsley organization was founded by Victor Yarsley a pioneer expert in plastics and an entrepreneur. Before the Second World War he had been a consultant in this new field and, starting in 1941 he had built a series of laboratories, mostly by converting and extending domestic premises, just as in the case of Fulmer. By 1970 his group consisted of Yarsley Research Laboratories (YRL) at Chessington, Surrey and Yarsley Testing Laboratories (YTL) at Ashtead, Surrey. A collaboration agreement was signed in 1970 and in 1973 Fulmer purchased Yarsley. By early 1974, most of the Chessington activities had been moved to another new building on the Stoke Poges site and the others to Ashtead.

Also in 1973 Fulmer purchased the engineering activities of Aeon Laboratories, Englefield Green, Surrey. Aeon's engineering work focussed on the manufacture of ancillary equipment for electron microscopes and for computers.

In 1975 Fulmer strengthened Yarsley's plastics processing capability by acquiring IPEC (Independent Plastics Engineering Centre) of Newhaven, Sussex. The Newhaven activities were combined with Yarsley's own plastics processing operation to form a new company: Yarsley Polymer Engineering Centre (YPEC).

In 1977 a new site was acquired at Redhill, Surrey to accommodate YPEC and the Yarsley research and testing facilities. This involved progressively transferring all the staff and equipment from Newhaven and Ashtead and the polymer facilities from Stoke Poges. A new company Yarsley Technical Centre Limited (YTEC) was set up to embrace all the activities carried out by YRL, YTL and YPEC.

In 1982 Fulmer established Fulmer Research & Development (Singapore) Pte Ltd, a joint venture with the Singapore-based company Chemical Laboratories Pte Ltd. The joint venture offered metallurgical and polymer-based technical services.

A second overseas company Fulmer Research (SA) Pty Ltd was set up in Johannesburg, South Africa in 1985. This was not successful and was closed after a few years.

=== The early 1980s: testing, accreditation and quality ===
From their earliest days both Fulmer and Yarsley Testing Laboratories had carried out a wide variety of tests for clients and had designed and constructed specialized test equipment. In 1982 both Fulmer Technical Services and Yarsley Technical Centre were awarded accreditation from the National Testing Laboratory Accreditation Scheme (NATLAS). (Note: Both NATLAS and NACCB are now part of the United Kingdom Accreditation Service (UKAS).) By the late 1970s American and European governments and business leaders had become increasingly concerned about competition from Japan. Many decided to adopt some Japanese industrial practices, including quality management, which was thought to have played a large part in the Japanese economic miracle. Beginning in the early 1980s, the quality standard BS 5750 (1979) became widely adopted by British companies. (Note: In 1987 BS 5750 was superseded by the international standard ISO 9000, which was derived from it.) In 1985, Yarsley Technical Centre, which already had a strong background in standards and accreditation, established Yarsley Quality Assured Firms (YQAF) as an independent certification body, supported by the UK Department of Trade and Industry. YQAF assessed conformity to BS 5750 and certified conforming companies. Its certification service was overseen by an independent Certification Board under an independent chairman, thus ensuring that there was no conflict of interest with YQAF's consultancy services. YQAF was successful and grew rapidly by establishing a network of regional offices throughout the UK. It was incorporated in 1987 and gained accreditation from the National Accreditation Council for Certification Bodies (NACCB).

=== Some notable projects and activities 1965 to 1989 ===
- Chemical Vapour Deposition (CVD). This was a major development area at Fulmer. A wide range of metals and inorganic compounds were deposited. Examples are: tungsten coating of graphite rocket nozzles for ablation resistance, boron nitride crucibles for melting gallium arsenide, alumina coatings on carbon fibres for reinforcement of aluminium, zinc sulphide infrared radomes for heat-seeking missiles. Fulmer's profound understanding of subhalide disproportionation led its chemists to devise a process in which halide vapour, pulsed at low partial pressure could be used to put uniform oxidation resistant coatings of aluminium or chromium on gas turbine blades. This was especially difficult because the coated surface had to include the insides of the blades' long narrow cooling passages – 2mm diameter and 180 mm long for example. In 1975 Fulmer hosted the fifth International Conference on Chemical Vapor Deposition.
- The Fulmer tension meter is a device for measuring the tension in ropes and cables. A fixed length of cable is displaced at right angles using a lever and cam. The tension in the cable is arrived at by measuring the consequent displacement in the frame of the meter. In 1971 Fulmer set up a joint company with the sponsor of this development and subsequently acquired all the shares. The meter continues to be produced and marketed by a successor company.
- Fulmer devised the RPD system for project planning under uncertainty and gave about a hundred training seminars to R&D investigators in the UK and abroad.
- The Fulmer Materials Optimizer (FMO). This was an information system designed to enable a rapid comparison of materials competing for any given application. Many of Fulmer's technical staff contributed information to the FMO and many clients subscribed to support its preparation. It was published in 1974 as four loose-leaf large format files. The FMO included many data sheets, nomograms and other charts. It illustrates the approach needed in 1974, before the days of hypertext and the World Wide Web.
- Ion Engine. In the early 1970s Fulmer participated in a collaborative programme on the development of ion thrusters for space propulsion. They constructed a Type T4A mercury ion thruster and a high-vacuum test facility. Grid life testing totalling over 2000 hours was successfully completed.
- In 1975 Fulmer obtained a two-year contract from UNIDO to set up a Metals Advisory Service (MAS) in Lahore Pakistan. The laboratories established then are now the Technical Service Centre of the Pakistan Standards and Quality Control Authority (PSQCA).
- Solar water-heating trials. In 1976 Fulmer built a solar laboratory on the Stoke Poges site. This was the approximate size and shape of a two-storey domestic dwelling and was mounted on a circular track so that it could be rotated to any orientation. Solar hot-water panels were mounted on the roof. Investigations determined the economical viability of various systems for space and water heating and which materials and processes should be used.
- The development of frame-to-hull bonding methods in GRP ships. The project enabled the construction of HMS Wilton (M1116) for the Royal Navy, (Wilton was a prototype coastal minesweeper/minehunter and the first warship in the world to be constructed from glass-reinforced plastic) and supported the development of the Royal Navy's Hunt class Mine countermeasures vessels.
- Shape Memory alloys. When an object made of a shape-memory alloy is deformed under suitable conditions it can be made to return to its original shape by heating. Researchers at Fulmer discovered that this phenomenon is not confined to intermetallic compounds such as NiTi, but is exhibited in many metal solid solutions also. They did extensive work on many alloy systems. Two example applications developed at Fulmer are: heat-shrinkabe sleeves for use as pipe couplings and an actuator for the deployment of solar panels on spacecraft.
- Starting in 1977 YRL undertook small scale synthesis of specified organic chemicals many of them the organo-fluorine compounds widely used in pharmaceutical research and as precursors in drug manufacture. This was successful and in 1988 a joint venture with Shell Chemicals UK was launched as Yarsley Fluorochemicals Ltd. This was later purchased by Shell. After a management buy-out, it now continues as JRD Fluorochemicals Ltd.
- Superdart. A marksman training system in which the point of impact of a rifle round on a target is computed by triangulation from the signals received from a number of acoustic sensors and is then displayed on a screen next to the firing point. This gives the marksman instant feedback on his accuracy. This is an example of a multi-disciplinary project. It involved ballistics, sensor technology and mathematical modelling as well as the development of new materials.
- Acoustic emission monitoring.
- Hydrophilic polymers for soft contact lenses. YTEC devised novel homopolymer and copolymer systems for soft contact lens preparations. A polymer system was formulated to exhibit a high degree of water containment in the swollen state and yet be sufficiently stable to form a precision lens to an individual prescription. YTEC developed a process to full production scale and commissioned the production facility on the client's premises.
- Body Armour.
- Fabrication of targets for the ISIS neutron source at the Rutherford-Appleton Laboratory. These consisted of an assembly of depleted uranium discs clad in zircalloy. The production process involved machining the uranium discs, sealing their zircalloy containers by electron-beam welding, hot isostatic pressing to develop a diffusion bond between the zircalloy and the uranium and then ultrasonic testing to verify the integrity of the bond before final assembly.
- Fulmer devised techniques for probabilistic mathematical modelling and in 1986 hosted the first international conference on Modelling under Uncertainty.

=== The gathering storm (1985 to 1989) ===
In accordance with the terms of IOP purchase, Fulmer's capital investment in new facilities was expected to be financed from profit and Fulmer would make a modest annual contribution to IOP funds. However, Fulmer's recent expansion and its large investment in capital equipment required increasing bank borrowing. Considerable management effort and other resources had been taken up with the transfer of facilities between Fulmer, Chessington, Ashtead, Redhill and Slough and there had been a damaging fire at Ashtead. It was clear that alternative sources of finance were needed. A management buyout was explored and found to be not feasible. Preparations were made for a stock exchange flotation but, in the late 1980s Fulmer sustained large losses and plans to float were postponed.

The balance of Fulmer's activities had changed. Academic research was now a minor part of its work. Most of its income came from testing, consultancy and small scale manufacture. The IOP were becoming concerned that their ownership of Fulmer as a commercial organization might be judged incompatible with their charitable status as a learned society. They were also concerned that Fulmer was making losses and had a growing overdraft. The IOP Council finally decided to sell Fulmer.

== Close (1990) ==
Initially IOP attempted to sell the company as a complete unit but when this was unsuccessful they decided to sell the Fulmer companies at Stoke Poges and Slough, and the Yarsley operation at Redhill as separate entities. In 1989 exploratory talks with an American testing and consultancy company were held regarding a merger with Yarsley but no agreement could be reached. An approach was then made to the UK subsidiary of the Swiss company Societe Generale de Surveillance S.A. (SGS), who were particularly interested in strengthening their activities in quality assurance consultancy and certification. Agreement was soon reached for them to purchase Yarsley, and the sale took place on November 30, 1990. The Fulmer activities at Stoke Poges were merged with BNF Metals Technology Centre at Wantage Oxfordshire, and the manufacturing unit at Slough was acquired by Sintek of Germany.

== Legacy ==
Fulmer was a pioneer of Contract R&D in the UK. During its forty five years it provided technical solutions and research results as well as testing and consultancy for hundreds of companies and national and international agencies across the whole field of materials technology and related areas of physics and chemistry. Many papers were published in learned journals and books and many patents were granted to Fulmer authors.

Fulmer sponsored the further education of its technicians and helped many young graduates in metallurgy, physics and other sciences on the road to successful careers. In the 1970s and 80s Fulmer undertook curriculum development projects in Berkshire and Buckinghamshire primary and secondary schools. It thus introduced many young people to engineering, to problem solving methods and to working in teams.[49] A senior staff member joined the Berkshire education advisory service from Fulmer to continue and extend work of this kind.

Among the companies and organizations that owe their origins to Fulmer are:

- Applied Microengineering Limited. In-situ aligned wafer bonding machines and services
- Archer Technicoat Limited. Chemical vapour deposition and infiltration; manufacture and supply of related equipment
- Building Investigation and Testing Services Limited
- Chemlab Technology (Singapore) Pte Ltd. Set up in 1982 as a joint venture between Fulmer and Chemlab International (Singapore) Pte Ltd.
- Hansford Sensors Limited. Manufacture and supply of vibration measurement equipment
- IPH Fulmer Rope Tension Meters
- JRD Fluorochemicals Limited
- M4 Technologies Ltd – a Nottingham University spin-out. Research, consultancy and technology transfer services in the fields of materials and surface engineering, metallurgy, manufacturing and project management.
- Phoenix Scientific Industries Limited. Gas atomization for the production of metal powders; manufacture and supply of related equipment
- Questans Limited. Software development and consultancy specializing in thesaurus management and R&D management. Traded until December 2007
- Quo-tec Limited. Consultancy on the management of innovation. Sold in 2003 to CSIR (South Africa).
- the Technical Service Centre of The Pakistan Standards and Quality Control Authority (PSQCA).
- USL Ultrasonic Sciences. A major supplier to industry of automated and semi-automated ultrasonic testing systems and instruments, worldwide.

== Fulmer people ==
=== Chairmen of the board ===
1945-1952	Col W C (Dev) Devereux CBE, FRAeS
?-1958	Spence Sanders
1958-1975	W R (Bill) Merton MA, FInstP
1975-1976	John D Rose FRS
1976-1977	Sir James Taylor MBE, DSc, FInstP
1978-1987	Sir Ieuan Maddock CB, OBE, FRS
1987-1991	Sir John Collyear FEng

=== Directors of Research ===
1945 - May 1969	E A G (Ted) Liddiard MA, CEng, FIM, FInstP
June 1969 - 1990	Dr W E (Eric) Duckworth OBE FIMM FInstP FREng

=== Long-standing members of the senior management team ===
Grev Brook; Bill Bowyer; David Davies; Mike Dewey; Bill Flavell; Philipp Gross; Eddie Sugars; GI Williams

=== Technical staff ===
Over the life of Fulmer about 500 people were members of staff. Among these, because of the wide range of projects that Fulmer undertook, investigators and other technical staff had to be able to adapt their specialist skills and to innovate. They were also expected to play a part in attracting the necessary funding from business or Government. (Note: In addition to the initial team, the following are some of those whose knowledge, skills and innovation over many years were important in sustaining Fulmer's achievements: David Bashford; Derek Berry; Charley Campbell; Norman Cheetham; Roger Davies; John Denison; Reg Easy; Keith Farmery; Patrick Finlay; Roger Freeman; Walter Gutteridge; Ben Hatt; Colin Hayman; Jim Jappy; Peter Kent; Harry King; Ron Lewin; Bill Mayes; Wictor Mikucki; Ken Mitchell; Bruce Moxley; Dave Mugridge; Paul Nice; Ken Page; Malcolm Riley; Tony Rogers; Ian Saunderson; Jeanne Silcock; Peter Stevens; Duncan Stewart; Mike Stuart; Victor Titow; Douglas Trafford; Laurie Turner; Norman Waterman; Jim Whittaker; George Yiasemides.)

=== Other notable Fulmer alumni ===
- Marjorie Caserio née Beckett
- John Coiley
- Ian Polmear
- David Trefgarne

== In popular culture ==
In 1969, Pinewood film studios hired a chemistry laboratory at Fulmer for use as a film set for the film "The Chairman" (also known as "The Most Dangerous Man in the World"), starring Gregory Peck.
