= Aerospace materials =

Materials used for aerospace purposes

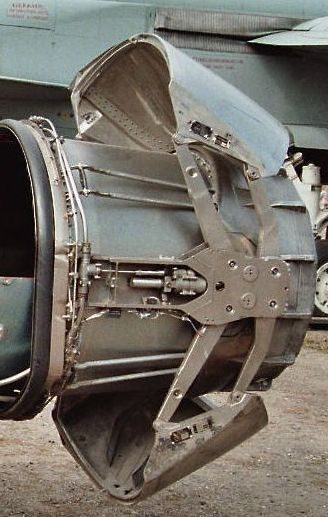
Titanium support structure for a jet engine thrust reverser

Aerospace materials are materials, frequently metal alloys, that have either been developed for, or have come to prominence through their use for aerospace purposes.

These uses often require exceptional performance, strength or heat resistance, even at the cost of considerable expense in their production or machining. Others are chosen for their long-term reliability in this safety-conscious field, particularly for their resistance to fatigue.

The field of materials engineering is an important one within aerospace engineering. Its practice is defined by the international standards bodies who maintain standards for the materials and processes involved. Engineers in this field may often have studied for degrees or post-graduate qualifications in it as a speciality.

== History ==
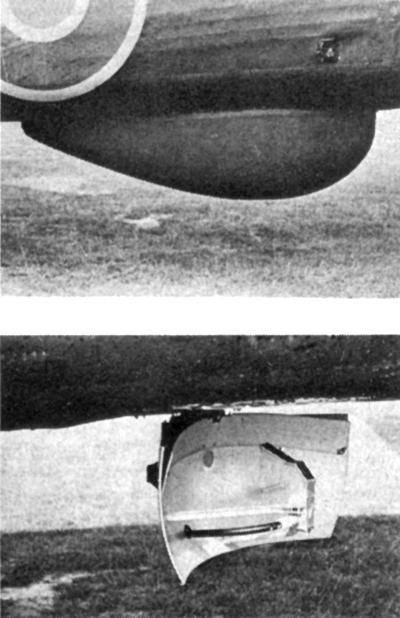
Radome over H2S radar scanner on a Halifax

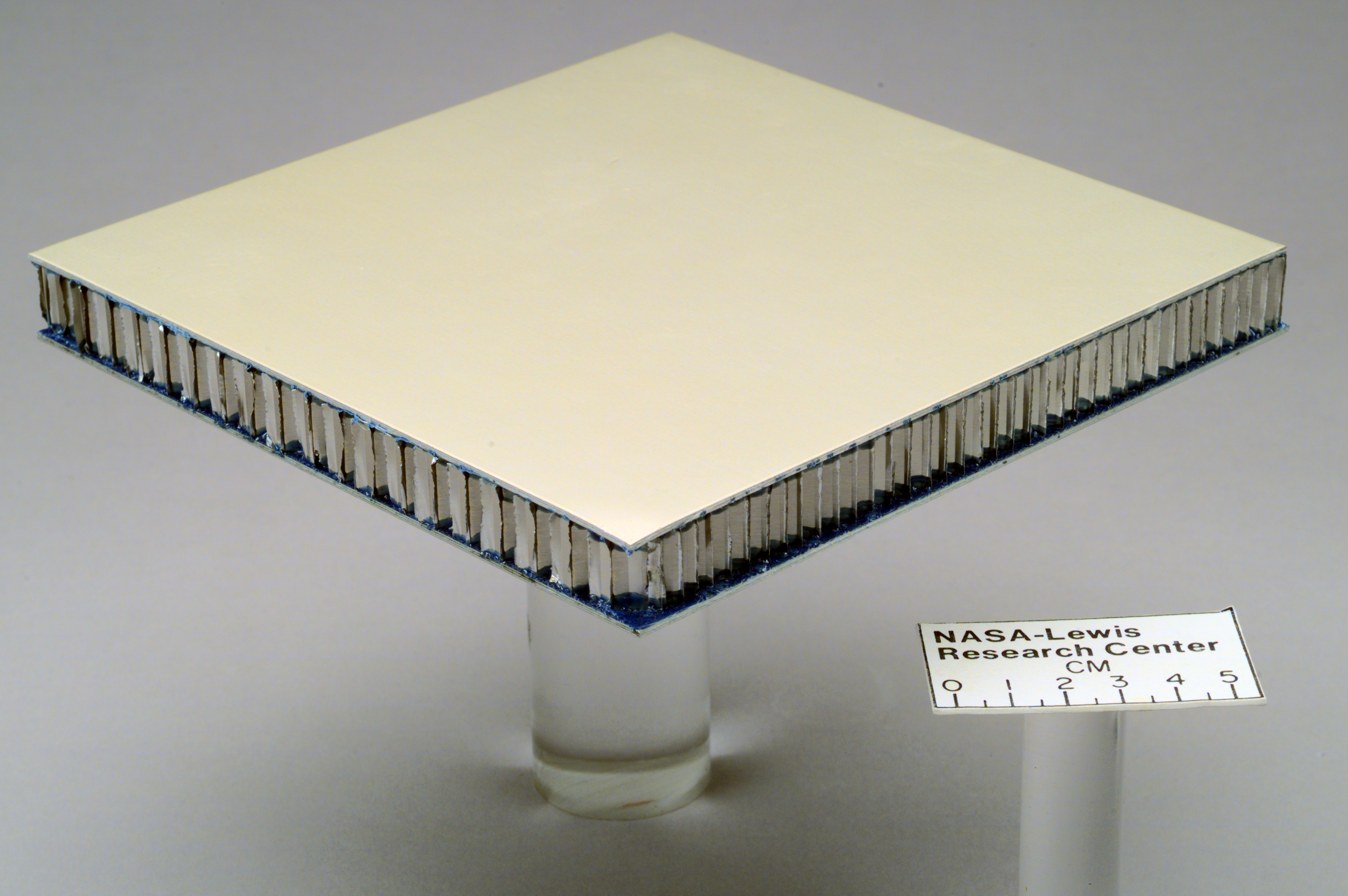
Honeycomb sandwich structure of Glass Reinforced Aluminium

=== Edwardian period ===
The first aerospace materials were those long-established and often naturally occurring materials used to construct the first aircraft. These included such mundane materials as timber for wing structures and fabric and dope to cover them. Their quality was of utmost importance and so the timber would be of carefully selected sitka spruce and the covering of Irish linen. Standards were required for the selection, manufacture, and use of these materials. These standards were developed informally by manufacturers or government groups such as HM Balloon Factory, later to become RAE Farnborough, often with the assistance of university engineering departments.

The next stage in the development of aerospace materials was to adopt newly developed materials, such as Duralumin the first age hardening aluminum alloy. These offered attributes not previously available. Many of these new materials also required study to determine the extent of these new properties, their behavior and how to make the best use of them. This work was often carried out through the new government-funded national laboratories, such as the Reichsanstalt (German Imperial Institute) or the British National Physical Laboratory (NPL).

=== World War I ===
The NPL was also responsible for perhaps the first deliberately engineered aerospace material, Y alloy. This first of the nickel-aluminum alloys was discovered after a series of experiments during World War I, deliberately setting out to find a better material for the manufacture of pistons for aircraft engines.

=== Interwar period ===
Between the wars, many aerospace innovations were in the field of manufacturing processes, rather than just an inherently stronger material, although these too benefited from improved materials. One of the R.R. alloys, R.R.53B, had added silicon which improved its fluidity when molten. This allowed its use for applications such as die casting as well as the previous sand casting, a means of producing parts that were both far cheaper and also more accurate in shape and finish. Better control of their shape allowed designers to shape them more precisely to their tasks, leading to parts that were also thinner and lighter.

Many interwar developments were to aircraft engines, which benefited from the vast improvements being made for the growing car industry. Although not strictly an 'aerospace' innovation, the use of refractory alloys like Stellite and Brightray for the hard-facing of exhaust valves offered huge gains in the reliability of aircraft engines. This itself encouraged long-range commercial flights, as the new engines were reliable enough to be considered safe for long flights across oceans or mountain ranges.

=== World War II ===
The de Havilland Albatross airliner of 1936 had a fuselage of wooden sandwich construction: wafers of birch plywood were spaced apart by a balsa sheet. This same construction achieved fame with its wartime use in the Mosquito fast bomber. As well as being a construction of light weight and high performance, it also avoided the use of aluminum, a strategic material during wartime, and could use the skills of woodworkers, rather than those of specialized aircraft metalworkers. When Germany attempted to copy this aircraft as the Moskito it was a failure, primarily for materials reasons. The original phenolic Tego film adhesive was only produced by a factory that was destroyed by bombing. Its replacement led directly to catastrophic failures and loss of the aircraft.

Radar became small enough to be carried on board aircraft, but the fragile feed horns and reflectors needed to be protected and streamlined from the airstream. Molded radomes were constructed, using the Perspex acrylic plastic that was already in use for cockpit windows. This could be heated to soften it, then molded or vacuum formed to shape. Other polymers developed at this time, notably Nylon, found uses in compact radio equipment as high-voltage insulators or dielectrics.

Honeycomb structures were developed as flat sandwich sheets used for bulkheads and decking. These were long established with wood and paper board construction, but required a more robust material for aerospace use. This was achieved towards the end of the war, with all-aluminum honeycomb sandwiches.

=== New materials ===
New lightweight materials include Ceramic matrix composites, metal matrix composites, polymer aerogels and CNT-yarns, along the evolution of polymer composites. These light weight materials have given way for stronger, more reliable structures, improved production times and increased power-to-weight ratios.

== Marketing outside aerospace ==
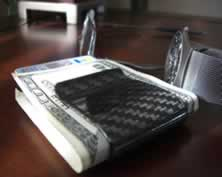
Carbon fiber money clip

The term "aerospace grade" has come to be a fashionable marketing slogan for luxury goods, particularly for cars and sporting goods. Bicycles, golf clubs, sailing yachts and even flashlights are all sold on the basis of their high-performance materials, whether these are relevant or not. Since their appearance in 1979, Maglite have advertised their use of 6061 aluminum for their torch bodies, one of the first to make a deliberate feature of aerospace materials for a non-performance reason.

Some sporting uses have been for the material's actual qualities. Many ski makers have produced skis wholly from cloth and resin composite materials, using the tailorability of such construction to vary the stiffness, damping and torsional stiffness of a ski along its length. Hexcel, a manufacturer of aluminum honeycomb sheet, became well known for its branded skis, using this same advanced material.

Sporting uses may be every bit as demanding as aerospace needs. Particularly in cycling, materials may be loaded more highly than in aerospace use, the risk of possible failure being seen as more acceptable than for aircraft.

Many uses of aerospace materials for sporting goods have been as the result of a 'peace dividend'. After World War II, Hiduminium alloy appeared in bicycle brake components as its maker sought to expand new markets to replace their previous military aircraft. In the 1990s, both smelters and recyclers of titanium sought new non-military markets after the end of the Cold War, finding them in both bicycle frames and golf clubs.

Carbon fiber composite, and its distinctive weave pattern, has become a popular decorative choice on cars and motorbikes, even in purely decorative contexts such as dashboards. This has extended to the use of flexible stick-on patterned vinyl to skeuomorphically reproduce the appearance without any of the physical properties.

== See also ==
- Index of aviation articles
