= Hypereutectic piston =

Piston made with high-silicon alloy

A hypereutectic piston is an internal combustion engine piston cast using a hypereutectic aluminum alloy with silicon content greater than the eutectic point of 12 weight percent silicon. Most aluminum-silicon casting alloys are hypoeutectic, meaning the silicon content is lower than the eutectic point, and contain relatively fine elemental silicon crystals formed through the eutectic reaction during solidification. In addition to fine silicon crystals, hypereutectic alloys also contain large primary silicon crystals that form before the eutectic reaction. As a result it contains a much higher phase fraction of silicon. Consequently, hypereutectic aluminum has a lower coefficient of thermal expansion, which allows engine designers to specify much tighter tolerances. The silicon content of these alloys is typically 16–19 weight percent, and above this content the mechanical properties and castability degrade substantially. Special molds, casting, and cooling techniques are required to obtain uniformly dispersed primary silicon particles throughout the piston material.

== Advantages ==
Most automotive engines use aluminum pistons that move in an iron cylinder. The average temperature of a piston crown in a gasoline engine during normal operation is typically about 300 °C (570 °F), and the coolant that runs through the engine block is usually regulated at approximately 90 °C (190 °F). Aluminum expands more than iron at this temperature range, so for the piston to fit the cylinder properly when at a normal operating temperature, the piston must have a loose fit when cold.

In 1970, increasing concern over exhaust pollution caused the U.S. government to form the Environmental Protection Agency (EPA), which began writing and enforcing rules that required automobile manufacturers to introduce changes that made their engines run cleaner. By the late 1980s, automobile exhaust pollution had been noticeably improved. More stringent regulations forced car manufacturers to adopt the use of electronically controlled fuel injection and hypereutectic pistons. Regarding pistons, it was discovered that when an engine was cold during start-up, a small amount of fuel became trapped between the piston rings. As the engine warmed up, the piston expanded and expelled this small amount of fuel which added to the number of unburnt hydrocarbons in the exhaust.

By adding silicon to the pistons alloy, the piston expansion was dramatically reduced. This allowed engineers to specify reduced clearance between the piston and the cylinder liner. Silicon itself expands less than aluminum. Another benefit of adding silicon is that the piston becomes harder and is less susceptible to scuffing which can occur when a soft aluminum piston is cold revved in a relatively dry cylinder on start-up or during abnormally high operating temperatures.

== Performance replacement alloys ==
When auto enthusiasts want to increase the power of the engine, they may add some type of forced induction. By compressing more air and fuel into each intake cycle, the power of the engine can be dramatically increased. This also increases the heat and pressure in the cylinder.

The normal temperature of gasoline engine exhaust is approximately 650 °C (1,200 °F). This is also approximately the melting point of most aluminum alloys, and it is only the constant influx of ambient air that prevents the piston from deforming and failing. Forced induction increases the operating temperatures while "under boost", and if the excess heat is added faster than the engine can shed it, the elevated cylinder temperatures will cause the air and fuel mix to auto-ignite on the compression stroke before the spark event. This is one type of engine knocking that causes a sudden shockwave and pressure spike, which can result in failure of the piston due to shock-induced surface fatigue. Which eats away the surface of the piston.

The "4032" performance piston alloy has a silicon content of approximately 11%. This means that it expands less than a piston with no silicon, but since the silicon is fully alloyed on a molecular level (eutectic), the alloy is less brittle and more flexible than a stock hypereutectic "smog" (low compression) piston. These pistons can survive mild detonation with less damage than stock pistons. 4032 and hypereutectic alloys have a low coefficient of thermal expansion. This allows tighter piston to cylinder bore fit at assembly temperature.

The "2618" performance piston alloy has less than 2% silicon and could be described as hypo (under) eutectic. This alloy is capable of experiencing the most detonation and abuse while suffering the least amount of damage. Pistons made of this alloy are also typically made thicker and heavier because of their most common applications in commercial diesel engines. Both because of the higher than normal temperatures that these pistons experience in their usual application, and the higher coefficient of thermal expansion due to low-silicon content causing greater thermal expansion. These pistons require a larger piston to cylinder bore clearance at assembly temperatures. This leads to a condition known as "piston slap" which is when the piston rocks in the cylinder and it causes an audible tapping noise that continues until the engine has warmed to operational temperatures.

== Forged versus cast ==
When a piston is cast, the alloy is heated until molten. It's then poured into a mold to create the basic shape. After the alloy cools and solidifies, it is removed from the mold and the rough casting is machined into its final shape. For applications which require stronger pistons, a forging process is used.

In the forging process, the rough casting is placed in a die set while it is still hot and semi-solid. A hydraulic press is used to place the rough slug under tremendous pressure. This removes any possible porosity, and also pushes the alloy grains together tighter than can be achieved by simple casting alone. The end result is a much stronger material.

Aftermarket performance pistons made from the most common 4032 and 2618 alloys are typically forged.

Compared to both 4032 and 2618 alloy forged pistons, hypereutectic pistons have less strength. Therefore, performance applications using boost, nitrous oxide, and/or high RPMs, forged pistons (made from either alloy) are preferred. However, hypereutectic pistons experience less thermal expansion than 2618 alloy forged pistons. For this reason, hypereutectic pistons can run a tighter piston to cylinder clearance than 2618 alloy forged pistons. This makes hypereutectic pistons a common choice for stock engines. Some vehicles do use forged pistons from the factory. Dodge Vipers used forged pistons from 1992-1999 model years, then switched to hypereutectic. The last generation of Vipers (2013-2017) used forged pistons. All Honda S2000s use forged pistons.

== See also ==
- Y alloy
- Hiduminium
