= Ted Liddiard =

English metallurgist and company director (1901–1994)

Edwin Andrew Guthrie Liddiard
- Born: Edwin Andrew Guthrie Liddiard; November 30, 1903; Thornton Heath, Surrey
- Died: April 20, 1981 (aged 77); Slough, Buckinghamshire
- Education: Christ's Hospital School and University of Cambridge
- Occupations: Metallurgist and founder director of the Fulmer Research Institute

Edwin Andrew Guthrie Liddiard (30 November 1903 – 20 April 1981) was an English metallurgist who was chosen by Col. Wallace Charles Devereux to be the first director of the Fulmer Research Institute. Under Liddiard's direction, Fulmer developed as Britain's first independent contract R&D organisation.

Liddiard became Chairman of the London section of the Institute of Metals, he was a member of the Inter-Services Metallurgical Council and he became Chairman and then Honorary Secretary of the Association of Consulting Scientists. He was instrumental in setting up and maintaining the Register of Consulting Scientists.

== Education ==
Liddiard was educated at Christ's Hospital School, but his schooling there ended prematurely due to a serious road traffic accident in 1920. The accident kept him in hospital for six months, and then required him to use a wheelchair and crutches for a further five months.

In 1922 he took a job as a laboratory assistant at Cammell Laird Cyclops Iron and Steel works in Sheffield and while there, he took evening classes at Sheffield University aiming for Associateship of the Institute of Metals. However, in 1925 an opportunity arose for him to go to Cambridge where he took Part I of the Natural Science Tripos in chemistry, physics and mineralogy and went on to study metallurgy for the final year, graduating in 1928.

== Career ==
Liddiard joined ICI Billingham as a research metallurgist where he specialised in corrosion problems then in 1931 he joined the British Non-Ferrous Metals Research Association, where he eventually became research manager. At BNF during World War II, Liddiard worked on copper alloys resistant to impingement attack, on controlled corrosion mechanisms for the release of mines, on the supply of magnesium aluminium eutectic alloys, and on the development of anti-ASDIC submarine bubble targets. He did experimental work on alloys for the Tube Alloys project. After the war, in 1945, Liddiard accepted the invitation of Col Devereux to be the founding director of Fulmer Research Institute.

== Other activities ==
Liddiard became Chairman of the London section of the Institute of Metals, he was a member of the Inter-Services Metallurgical Council and, after his retirement from the Executive Directorship of Fulmer, he became Chairman and then Honorary Secretary of the Association of Consulting Scientists.

He was instrumental in setting up and maintaining the Register of Consulting Scientists, carrying on with this as editor and registrar after his retirement from Fulmer.

In 1971 and 1972 he was sent on United Nations missions to Pakistan and Iran, to advise on the setting up of centres for metallurgical technology. His work in Pakistan has led, through a further UNIDO contract with Fulmer, to the setting up of a successful independent Metals Advisory service there, now part of PSQCA.
