= Philipp Gross =

- Born: September 30, 1899; Vienna, Austria-Hungary
- Died: May 20, 1974 (aged 74); London, England
- Education: TU Wien; University of Vienna
- Known for: Thermodynamic analysis in extractive metallurgy; sub-chloride (subhalide) process for aluminium extraction
- Scientific career
- Fields: Physical chemistry
- Workplaces: University of Vienna; University of Bristol; Fulmer Research Institute

Philipp Gross (September 30, 1899 – May 20, 1974) was a physical chemist born and educated in Vienna. He became Professor of Physical Chemistry at Vienna University but was expelled on racial grounds in 1938 under the Nazi regime. In 1939 he sought refuge in Britain, joining the physics department at Bristol University. On the outbreak of war, after a brief internment as an enemy alien, he returned to Bristol University and then worked in Industry. After the war he became Chief Scientist at the newly founded Fulmer Research Institute, a post which he occupied for more than twenty years. He was one of the first to apply rigorous thermodynamic analysis to problems in extractive metallurgy and was the inventor of the sub-chloride process for the extraction of aluminium.

== Early life and education ==
Philipp Gross was born on 30 September 1899, Vienna, the son of Berthold Gross, chief accountant of the Austrian North West Railway. He attended the Erzherzog-Rainer-Realgymnasium, since renamed the Sigmund Freud Gymnasium in honour of its most famous pupil, and matriculated with distinction in 1917.

In the First World War he did military service in Serbia and in 1917 was briefly interned in Cattaro, present day Kotor.

On release from military service in 1918, he studied Chemistry at Vienna Technical University, (TU Wien), graduating in 1920.

== Vienna University ==
He studied physics and chemistry at the University of Vienna under the supervision of Professor Alfons Franz Klemenc. Gross was awarded the degree of D.Phil. in 1923.

He joined the university research staff in 1922, receiving the highest teaching qualification, Venia legendi in Physical and Theoretical Chemistry in 1930. In 1928 he was involved in the creation of the physical-chemistry department, and he was head of this department from 1929 to 1937.

In 1931 the Austrian Academy of Sciences awarded him the Rudolf Wegscheider prize and in 1936 he was promoted to Associate Professor.

His work in the 1930s included:

- Theory of strong electrolytes, especially in non-aqueous solutions
- Acid-base catalysis
- Thermodynamics of strong electrolytes, experiments with deuterium and with heavy water

In 1937 Gross took sabbatical leave from the University of Vienna and became a visiting professor at Istanbul University.

In 1938 or 1939 He was made a full professor at Istanbul University.

== Expulsion ==
Following the Anschluss in 1938, more than 2,700 mostly Jewish affiliates of the University of Vienna - lecturers, students and administration employees - were dismissed and subsequently forced to emigrate or were murdered. Gross, as a Jew, was dismissed and was one of the more than 200 people who were stripped of their academic titles.

== Refuge in Britain ==
In the summer of 1939 Gross came to England to attend a scientific conference and remained after the conference, joining the physics department of Bristol University as a lecturer.

Gross was to become naturalised as a British Subject in 1948.

== The war years 1939 - 1945 ==
In late 1939 Gross was interned as an enemy alien in the Isle of Man He was one of eight internees from the physics department of Bristol University. The Head of Department at the time. Arthur Tyndall, described this loss as a 'bombshell'. Anticipating the requirements of what would become the Tube Alloys project, he lobbied for their release. He wrote to George Thomson, chairman of the MAUD Committee 'a spanner is thrown in the works if all these friendly aliens are excluded'.

In January 1940 a tribunal decided that Gross should be exempt from internment and in June 1940 he was released. and returned to Bristol University. As well as Bristol he lectured at King's College, London

In 1943 Gross joined the staff of High Duty Alloys Limited (HDA) and in 1944 of International Alloys Limited (Intal).

== Fulmer Research Institute ==
In 1945 Colonel Wallace Devereux founded Almin Limited (Associated Light Metal Industries) which brought together a group of companies, including Intal, involved with the production and processing of aluminium and magnesium alloys. He founded a new company, the Fulmer Research Institute, to offer services to Government and industry as Britain's first contract R&D organization and to be Almin's R&D unit. In June 1946 he appointed Gross as Fulmer's chief scientist.

Gross never learned to drive a car. When asked why he replied "I am a theoretician!". One consequence of this attitude was that he took particular care in building a team of skilled and expert experimentalists to test his ideas and determine the data he needed. This team was headed first by Leon Levi and then by Colin Hayman. (Note: Some long-serving members of the physical chemistry team were: Barry Bines; Jim Bingham; Tony Bowry; Charles Campbell; John Christie; Ernest Dewing; David Greene; Peter Kent; Ron Lewin; Mike Stuart; George Wilson.)

Gross's twenty-year career at Fulmer was devoted to two main inter-related research programmes:

- The sub-halide catalytic distillation method for extractive metallurgy.

Gross began this work at International Alloys and, when Fulmer was founded, this became Fulmer's first contract. He speculated and then proved that aluminium has a subhalide AlCl. He devised a method by which pure aluminium can be catalytically distilled from any aluminium-containing alloy or mixture or from scrap aluminium using the following reversible reaction:

2Al(solid) + AlCl_{3}(vapour) $\ce{\rightleftharpoons}$ 3AlCl(vapour)

The forward reaction is favoured at high temperature and low partial pressure of AlCl_{3}. On cooling, the reaction reverses; aluminium condenses and the trichloride can be recirculated. He went on to develop analogous methods for the extraction of beryllium and of titanium.

- Determination of thermodynamic data by high accuracy calorimetry.

Heats of formation and free energies of formation were needed for the assessment of potential rocket fuels. Fulmer established equipment and skills for very accurate measurement of heats of formation and heats of reaction. This is where the experimental skills of his team were important. Each determination presented its own challenges. Reaction conditions could be extreme: burning in fluorine might have to be contained or temperatures up to 2000 °C might be needed. Often, specially designed apparatus had to be blown from glass or silica. Calorimeter fluid temperatures were measured to 2×10^{−4} K. Over the many years that this work continued, Fulmer established thermodynamic data for a wide range of metal halides, intermetallics, mixed oxides and other compounds. See for example

Perhaps Philipp Gross's major contribution to technology was his pioneering work in applying rigorous thermodynamic analysis to extractive metallurgy and other fields of materials science.

Professor Denys Richardson of Imperial College, in his lecture "Basic Knowledge, Discovery, and Invention in the Birth of New Metallurgical Processes", took as an example Gross's discovery of AlCl and invention of the subhalide process for aluminium extraction. He concluded:

So far as the conception of the process is concerned, the important points are the way Gross saw significance in a chance piece of information which others consistently neglected, how he deduced the existence of AlCl from the most basic of chemical principles, and how he then applied this in an utterly different context.

— Professor F D Richardson, Hatfield Memorial lecture (1964)

== Personal life ==
He was married to Maria and had one daughter Mali. Gross was a keen student of art history with particular expertise in Byzantine art. With his wife Maria he built a collection of icons, prints and contemporary paintings.

In 1968 Gross retired from his post at Fulmer though he continued to advise as a consultant. He took particular satisfaction when, in 1969, the Philosophy Faculty of Vienna University awarded him the title of Honorary Professor. This restored to him the status that had been stripped from him by the Third Reich more than thirty years before.

His younger brother Eric E.B. Gross was also educated at the Technical University of Vienna and he too emigrated to England in 1938. After moving to the United States in 1939, he went on to become internationally renowned as electric power engineer. author and educator.

Gross died in London on 20 May 1974.
