= Hans Suess =

Hans Eduard Suess
- Born: 29 December 1909; Vienna, Austria
- Died: 20 September 1993 (aged 83); La Jolla, California, US
- Education: University of Vienna
- Known for: Suess effect
- Awards: V. M. Goldschmidt Award (1974); Leonard Medal of the International Meteoritical Society (1977)
- Scientific career
- Fields: Cosmochemistry
- Workplaces: University of Hamburg; University of Chicago; U.S. Geological Survey; Scripps Institution of Oceanography; University of California, San Diego
- Doctoral advisor: Philipp Gross
- Doctoral students: Ellen R. M. Druffel; Laurel L. Wilkening

Hans Eduard Suess (December 16, 1909 – September 20, 1993) was an Austrian-born American physical chemist and nuclear physicist. He was a grandson of the Austrian geologist Eduard Suess.

== Career ==
Suess earned his Ph.D. in chemistry from the University of Vienna in 1935 under the supervision of Philipp Gross. During World War II, he was part of a team of German scientists studying nuclear power and was advisor to the production of heavy water in a Norwegian plant (see Operation Gunnerside).

After the war, he collaborated on the shell model of the atomic nucleus with future (1963) Nobel Prize winner Hans Jensen.

In 1950, Suess emigrated to the United States. He did research in the field of cosmochemistry, investigating the abundance of certain elements in meteorites with Harold Urey (Nobel Prize in Chemistry, 1934) at the University of Chicago. In 1955, Suess was recruited for the faculty of Scripps Institution of Oceanography, and in 1958 he became one of the four founding faculty members of the University of California, San Diego. He remained at UCSD as professor until 1977 and as emeritus professor thereafter. He established a laboratory at UCSD for carbon-14 determinations, where he trained students including Ellen R. M. Druffel, now the Fred Kavli Professor of Earth System Science at University of California, Irvine.

Suess's most recent research was focused on the distribution of carbon-14 and tritium in the oceans and atmosphere. On basis of radiocarbon analyses of annual growth-rings of trees he contributed to

- the calibration of the radiocarbon dating scale, and
- the study of the magnitude of the dilution of atmospheric radiocarbon by carbon dioxide from fossil fuels burned since the industrial revolution. This dilution is known as the Suess effect (see articles about the anthropogenic greenhouse effect).

The mineral suessite, a Fe, Ni-silicide in Enstatit-Chondrites, is named after him.

== Death ==
On September 20, 1993, Suess died in a La Jolla retirement home.

== Name confusion ==
Suess was frequently confused—by the US Postal Service among others—with a contemporary, the famed children's writer Dr. Seuss (Theodor Seuss Geisel), when both men resided in La Jolla, California. The two names have been posthumously linked as well: both men's personal papers are housed in Geisel Library at the University of California, San Diego.
