= Ellen R. M. Druffel =

American oceanographer

Ellen Rodriguez Mary Druffel
- Born: 1953 (age 72–73)
- Education: University of California, San Diego
- Awards: Roger Revelle Medal (2016)
- Scientific career
- Thesis: Radiocarbon in annual coral rings of the Pacific and Atlantic Oceans (1980)
- Doctoral advisor: Hans Suess

Ellen Druffel is an American oceanographer and isotope geochemist known for her research using radiocarbon to track marine processes. Druffel was born in Los Angeles, CA, but raised in Pasadena.

== Career ==
Druffel is a professor who holds the Fred Kavli Endowed Chair in Earth System Science at U.C. Irvine, where she was one of the department's founding faculty members. She received a B.S. in chemistry from Loyola Marymount University in 1975 and a PhD in chemistry in 1980 from the Department of Chemistry at U.C. San Diego, where her Ph.D. advisor was Hans Suess.

== Awards ==
In 1990, Druffel received the James B. Macelwane Medal from the American Geophysical Union. Druffel is a fellow of the American Association for the Advancement of Science (2001), and a fellow of The Oceanography Society (2009). In 2004 she was awarded the Ruth Patrick Award from the American Society of Limnology and Oceanography. The Ruth Patrick Award is given "to honor outstanding research by a scientist in the application of basic aquatic science principles to the identification, analysis and/or solution of important environmental problems.". Druffel's Ruth Patrick award acknowledged "her sustained critical contributions on the composition and age of dissolved, particulate, and sedimentary carbon and for furthering the understanding of the processes governing the fate and distribution of oceanic carbon and the important role that the oceans play in global carbon flux." In 2016 she was awarded the Roger Revelle Medal from the American Geophysical Union. Druffel was elected to the National Academy of Sciences in 2020.

== Research ==
Druffel's research uses radiocarbon to track marine processes, focusing in two areas: coral paleoclimate records and marine organic matter carbon cycling. She is the author of more than 180 publications in the scientific literature.

== Selected publications ==
- Druffel, E.; Williams, P.; Bauer, J.; Ertel, J (1992). "Cycling of Dissolved and Particulate Organic Matter in the Open Ocean". Journal of Geophysical Research: Oceans. 97 (C10): 15639–15659. Bibcode:1992JGR....9715639D. doi:10.1029/92jc01511. S2CID 54492140.
- Edwards, R. L.; Beck, J. W.; Burr, G. S.; Donahue, D. J.; Chappell, J. M. A.; Bloom, A. L.; Druffel, E. R. M.; Taylor, F. W. (14 May 1993). "A Large Drop in Atmospheric 14C/12C and Reduced Melting in the Younger Dryas, Documented with 230Th Ages of Corals". Science. 260 (5110): 962–968. Bibcode:1993Sci...260..962E. doi:10.1126/science.260.5110.962. PMID 17818386. S2CID 30531828.
- Eglinton, T. I.; Aluwihare, L. I.; Bauer, J. E. (1996). "Gas chromatographic isolation of individual compounds from complex matrices for radiocarbon dating" (PDF). Analytical Chemistry. 68 (5): 904–912. doi:10.1021/ac9508513. PMID 21619188. S2CID 29957103.
- Ingalls, A. E.; Shah, S. R.; Hansman, R. L.; Aluwihare, L. I.; Santos, G. M.; Druffel, E. R. M.; Pearson, A. (25 April 2006). "Quantifying archaeal community autotrophy in the mesopelagic ocean using natural radiocarbon". Proceedings of the National Academy of Sciences. 103 (17): 6442–6447. Bibcode:2006PNAS..103.6442I. doi:10.1073/pnas.0510157103. PMC 1564200. PMID 16614070.
- Williams, P.; Druffel, E. (1987). "Radiocarbon in Dissolved Organic-Matter in the Central North Pacific Ocean". Nature. 330 (6145): 246–248. Bibcode:1987Natur.330..246W. doi:10.1038/330246a0. S2CID 4329024.
