= Eric Duckworth =

English metallurgist and company director (1925–2012)

Walter Eric Duckworth
- Born: Walter Eric Duckworth; 2 August 1925; Blackburn, Lancashire
- Died: February 4, 2012 (aged 86); Stoke Poges, Buckinghamshire
- Citizenship: British
- Education: Queens College, University of Cambridge
- Occupations: Metallurgist and statistician, then director of the Fulmer Research Institute
- Organization: Fulmer Research Institute
- Predecessor: Ted Liddiard
- Spouse: Emma
- Children: Stephen

Walter Eric Duckworth OBE was an English metallurgist and statistician who became a pioneer of industrial operational research.

== Career and training ==
Graduating from the University of Cambridge (Queens College), Duckworth joined the Glacier Metal Company in an atmosphere of continuous innovation under Wilfred (later Lord) Brown and alongside Elliott Jaques. Duckworth went on to develop statistical control techniques which helped one factory to triple its production.

In 1960 Duckworth joined the British Iron and Steel Research Association where he eventually became assistant director. His Metallurgy Division there led the development of high strength low alloy steels for automobile applications.

With a colleague, Geoff Hoyle, he pioneered the electro-slag refining method used to remove inclusions from the very high strength steels used for example for aircraft undercarriages. Such inclusions could otherwise cause premature failure by metal fatigue.

In 1968 Duckworth was awarded an external PhD by Cambridge. In 1969 on the retirement of Ted Liddiard Duckworth was head hunted by the board of Fulmer Research Institute to be its Director of Research. Fulmer was then the only commercial contract research company in the UK. Duckworth transformed Fulmer from a mainly government supported institute to an international organisation with three sites in the UK and joint operations in USA, Singapore and South Africa.

In the 1980s contract research became recognised as the way forward for many Research Associations and other institutions and Duckworth helped to forge what became the Association of Independent Research and Technology Organisations (AIRTO) and was its president twice. He edited his book Contract Research (1991) following the first Conference of the European Association of Contract Research Organizations, a major international conference.

In 1975 he was president of the Institution of Metallurgists and secured its Royal Charter. He was elected to the Royal Academy of Engineering in 1980.

== Works ==
Duckworth's first book A Guide to Operational Research was the first description of the industrial use of the operational research techniques that had been developed during World War II.

His second book Statistical Techniques in Technological Research described, in laymen's language, the many methods of rigorous experimental design which were becoming widely used and which helped Glacier become one of the world's leading manufacturers of plain bearings.

== Awards ==
Duckworth was appointed OBE in the New Year honours list of 1991 on his retirement.

He received honorary doctorates from Brunel University of London and from University of Surrey.

He served on many committees promoting innovation and engineering and was a trustee of the Comino Foundation from 1981 until his death.

== Publications ==
- Duckworth, Walter Eric (1965) [First published 1962]. Guide to Operational Research. London: Methuen. ISBN 0416407803. LCCN 65009195.
- Duckworth, W. E. (1968). Statistical Techniques in Technological Research. Methuen. ISBN 0416442900.
- Duckworth, W. E.; Hoyle, G. (1969). Electro-Slag Refining. Chapman & Hall. ISBN 0389012661.
- Duckworth, Walter Eric, ed. (1991). Contract Research: Proceedings of the First Conference of the European Association of Contract Research Organizations | Amsterdam, the Netherlands, February, 26-27, 1990. Springer. ISBN 0792314492.
