= Nickel–aluminium alloy =

Nickel–aluminium alloy may refer to:

- Y alloy, series of aluminium alloys with addition of nickel developed during WWI;
- Hiduminium, series of aluminium alloys with addition of nickel developed before WWII;
- Nickel aluminide, alloys containing much more nickel than the previous ones.
