= Melita Norwood =

British civil servant and Soviet spy (1912–2005)

- Norwood in later life
- Born: Melita Stedman Sirnis; 25 March 1912; Bournemouth, Dorset, England
- Died: 2 June 2005 (aged 93); Wolverhampton, West Midlands, England
- Other name: "Letty"
- Occupations: Personal assistant, spy
- Political party: Independent Labour Party (until mid-1930s); Communist Party of Great Britain (from mid-1930s)
- Spouse: Hilary Nussbaum (m. 1935; died 1986)
- Children: 1
- Awards: Order of the Red Banner of Labour (1958)
- Espionage activity
- Allegiance: Soviet Union
- Service years: 1937–1972
- Codename: Hola

Melita Stedman Norwood (née Sirnis Latvian: [zirnis]; 25 March 1912 – 2 June 2005) was a British civil servant, Communist Party of Great Britain member and KGB spy.

Born to a British mother and Latvian father, Norwood is most famous for supplying the Soviet Union with state secrets concerning the development of atomic weapons from her job at the British Non-Ferrous Metals Research Association, where she worked for 40 years. Despite the high strategic value of the information she passed to the Soviets, she refused to accept any financial rewards for her work. She rejected the Soviets' offer of a pension, and argued that her disclosures of classified work helped to avoid the possibility of a third world war involving the United States, Britain, and the Soviet Union.

In The Mitrokhin Archive: The K.G.B. in Europe and the West, co-authored by Christopher Andrew, she is described as "both the most important British female agent in KGB history and the longest serving of all Soviet spies in Britain." She is also described by the Communist Party of Britain as "a real heroine" and "a consistent fighter in defence of peace and socialism." She was a longtime supporter of the Morning Star newspaper, and its predecessor the Daily Worker.

In popular culture, she is best known for her depiction in the 2018 spy drama Red Joan, whose protagonist was loosely inspired by Norwood's life.

== Early life ==
Norwood was born Melita Sirnis at 402 Christchurch Road in Bournemouth, Dorset on 25 March 1912, the daughter of British mother Gertrude Stedman Sirnis and Latvian father Peter Alexander Sirnis (Latvian: Pēteris Aleksandrs Zirnis). Her father was a close associate of both the Bolsheviks and Leo Tolstoy before he died of tuberculosis in 1918, when Melita was six years old. He produced a newspaper entitled The Southern Worker: A Labour and Socialist Journal, which was influenced by the October Russian Revolution, and the paper published his translations of works by Lenin and Trotsky. He was involved with the Tuckton House group of exiles, publishing translated editions of Tolstoy's works. Her mother joined the Co-operative Party. Norwood won a scholarship in 1923 for an education at Itchen Secondary School, Southampton, becoming school captain in 1928. She then went on to study Latin and Logic at the University College of Southampton, before dropping out in 1931. After leaving University, Norwood moved to the German city of Heidelberg, where she stayed for a year and became involved in anti-fascist activism.

== Career ==
From 1932, Sirnis worked as a secretary with the British Non-Ferrous Metals Research Association. Towards the end of 1935, she married Hilary Nussbaum, who was of Russian Jewish descent (he later changed his name to Norwood), a chemistry teacher, teachers' trades union official, and lifelong communist.

Melita Norwood left the Independent Labour Party after the group splintered in the mid-1930s, after which she joined the Communist Party of Great Britain and became an active supporter of the party's newspaper The Daily Worker. The British authorities were not aware of her party affiliation until very much later. In 1935 she was recommended to the NKVD (forerunner of the KGB) by Andrew Rothstein, a leading member of the Communist Party of Great Britain, and became a full agent in 1937. In the same year, the Norwoods bought their semi-detached house in Bexleyheath, where they led an apparently unremarkable life together. Melita Norwood would continue to live there until she was 90.

=== Espionage ===
Norwood's NKVD espionage career began in the mid-1930s as a member of the Woolwich Spy ring in London. Three of its members were arrested in January 1938 and sentenced to between three and six years in prison, but Melita Norwood was not then detained. Meanwhile, a wave of purges in Moscow led the NKVD to cut back on its overseas espionage activities. Responsibility for Norwood was turned over to the GRU, the Soviet Union's military overseas intelligence service. Her Soviet handlers gave her a succession of different code names, the last being "Agent Hola".

Her position as secretary to G. L. Bailey, head of a department at the British Non-Ferrous Metals Research Association, enabled Norwood to pass her Soviet handlers material relating to the British atomic weapons project, known at the time by the innocuous name of Tube Alloys. Bailey was on an advisory committee to Tube Alloys. According to Jeremy Bernstein, Bailey was "warned about Norwood's political associations and was careful not to reveal anything to her."

In 1958, she was awarded the Order of the Red Banner of Labour.

The British security services eventually identified Norwood as a security risk in 1965, but refrained from questioning her to avoid disclosing their methods. She retired in 1972. Her husband died in 1986, and Norwood said in 1999 that he had disapproved of her activities as an agent. Her neighbours in Bexleyheath, while aware of her left-wing beliefs, reacted with astonishment, as did her daughter, when she was unmasked as a spy in 1999.

=== Mitrokhin Archive ===
Norwood's espionage activities were first publicly revealed by former KGB archivist Vasili Mitrokhin, in the book The Mitrokhin Archive: The K.G.B. in Europe and the West (1999), co-written by the historian Christopher Andrew. Mitrokhin defected in 1992, giving the British authorities six trunkloads of his handwritten notes which were earlier rejected by the Central Intelligence Agency as possible fakes. Norwood was well known to be a communist sympathiser but a separate report in 1999 stated that British intelligence became aware of her significance only after Mitrokhin's defection; to protect other investigations it was then decided not to prosecute her. Some have questioned the validity of evidence from the Mitrokhin archive. Many scholars remain sceptical of the context and authenticity of the notes of Mitrokhin. In any event, Norwood was never charged with an offence.

=== Motive ===
Norwood said she gained no material benefits from her spying activities. While she said she did not generally "agree with spying against one's country", she had hoped her actions would help "Russia to keep abreast of Britain, America and Germany". In 2014, newly released files from the Mitrokhin archive suggest she was more highly valued by the KGB than the Cambridge Five.

In a statement at the time of her exposure, she said:

I did what I did, not to make money, but to help prevent the defeat of a new system which had, at great cost, given ordinary people food and fares which they could afford, a good education and a health service.

=== Red Joan ===
Red Joan is a 2018 film very loosely inspired by Norwood's life, starring Judi Dench and Sophie Cookson. It was directed by Trevor Nunn, and produced by David Parfitt, with a screenplay by Lindsay Shapero. The film, based on the novel of the same name by Jennie Rooney, was shot in the UK, despite some scenes being set in Canada. It premiered at the 2018 Toronto International Film Festival.

== Death ==
On 2 June 2005, at the age of 93, Norwood died at New Cross Hospital in Wolverhampton, West Midlands and her body was cremated.

== See also ==
- Mitrokhin Archive
- Information Research Department
