= 2218 aluminium alloy =

Aluminium copper alloy

A2218 T72

Physical properties
- Density (ρ): 2.77

Mechanical properties
- Young's modulus (E): 73 GPa (10,600 ksi)
- Tensile strength (σ_{t}): 330 MPa (48 ksi)
- Elongation (ε) at break: 11%
- Poisson's ratio (ν): 0.33
- Hardness—Rockwell: 56 HRB

Thermal properties
- Melting temperature (T_{m}): 510 °C (950 °F)
- Thermal conductivity (k): 140 W/m*K
- Linear thermal expansion coefficient (α): 2.2*10^{−5} K^{−1}
- Specific heat capacity (c): 870 J/kg*K

Electrical properties
- Volume resistivity (ρ): 41.3 nOhm*m

2218 aluminium alloy is an alloy in the wrought aluminium-copper family (2000 or 2xxx series). It is one of the most complex grades in the 2000 series, with at least 88.4% aluminium by weight. Unlike most other aluminium-copper alloys, 2218 is a high work-ability alloy, with relatively low for 2xxx series alloy yield strength of 255 MPa. Despite being highly alloyed, it have a good corrosion and oxidation resistance due sacrificial anode formed by magnesium inclusions, similar to marine-grade 5xxx series alloys. Although 2218 is wrought alloy, owing to granular structure it can be used in casting and been precisely machined after casting. It is easy to weld, coat, or glue.

Good workability, thermal conductivity and dimensional stability make 2218 alloy a material of choice whenever high-precision parts subject to thermal shocks (especially piston engine cylinders and cylinder heads) are needed.

2218 alloy can be heat treated to increase tensile strength in expense of workability, with most common grades been F, T61, T71 and T72.

Alternative names for 2218 alloy are A2218 and A92218.

== Chemical Composition ==
The chemical composition of 2218 alloy is poorly standardized, with several variants in production. All variants include both copper (4%) and magnesium (1.5%) as major alloying elements. Common alloy variants also include 2% of nickel. The alloy composition of 2218 aluminium is:

- Aluminium: 91.35 to 92.95%
- Copper: 3.5 to 4.5%
- Magnesium: 1.2 to 1.8%
- Nickel: 1.7 to 2.3%
- Iron: 1% max
- Silicon: 0.9% max
- Zinc: 0.25% max
- Manganese: 0.5% max
- Tin: 0.25% max
- Chromium: 0.1% max

== See also ==
- Y alloy (precursor of A2218 with same major alloying elements)
