= William "Bill" Ralph Merton =

British military scientist and merchant banker

William Ralph Merton
- Born: William Ralph Merton; 25 November 1917; Westminster, London, England
- Died: 2 September 2014 (aged 96); Hampshire, England
- Education: Balliol College, Oxford University
- Occupations: Military scientist; Merchant banker
- Known for: Air warfare research

William Ralph Merton (25 November 1917 – 2 September 2014) was a British military scientist and merchant banker known for his work in developing improved bombing and air defence tactics for the Royal Air Force during World War II. After the war, Merton directed an industrial research institute, worked as a venture capitalist and served as the chairman of the merchant bank Robert Fleming & Co. between 1974 and 1980.

== Early life and education ==
Merton was born in the Westminster area of London in 1917, the third of five sons of the physicist and art collector Sir Thomas Ralph Merton and his wife Violet Marjory Merton. William Merton attended Eton College before studying physics at Balliol College, Oxford, graduating in 1938. He initially planned to join the English Bar as a lawyer, and was called to the Inner Temple in 1944, though he ultimately chose a career in science and finance instead.

== Military research ==
During World War II, Merton worked as a researcher with the Admiralty and RAF, analysing the performance of pilots and developing optimum strategies for air defence, anti-submarine warfare and aerial bombardment. After discovering that the depth charges used by British anti-submarine aircraft often detonated too deep to destroy German U-boats, Merton and his fellow researchers developed an improved bombsight for naval bombers. This may have been the Low Level Bombsight, Mark III, designed by Bomber Command's Operational Research Section. Between 1943 and 1945, Merton also served as a scientific adviser to Frederick Lindemann, 1st Viscount Cherwell, who in turn advised Winston Churchill in military and scientific matters. After the war, Merton served for some years as chairman of the Fulmer Research Institute at Stoke Poges, conducting materials research for state and industrial projects.

== Financial career and later life ==
In 1950, Merton joined the Erlangers banking house in the City of London, and assisted it in raising capital for numerous ventures, including a company that processed seaweed into industrial fibre. He was made Partner at the bank by Chairman Leo d'Erlanger. Through his work with Erlangers, Merton was also at one point involved in efforts to finance the Channel Tunnel. In 1963, he became the director of the merchant bank and asset manager Robert Fleming & Co., eventually serving as its chairman between 1974 and 1980. He later retired to Hampshire, where he remained until his death at the age of 96 in 2014.

== Personal life ==
In 1950, Merton married Anthea Lascelles, with whom he had three sons. After Anthea died in 1976, Merton married Judy Gwynne (née Rutherford), who survived him. Merton was an enthusiastic gardener and maker of furniture, and even designed his own house in Hampshire.
