= Suess effect =

Atmospheric chemical signature of fossil fuel burning

The Suess effect is a change in the ratio of the atmospheric concentrations of heavy isotopes of carbon (^{13}C and ^{14}C) by the admixture of large amounts of fossil-fuel derived CO_{2}, which contains no ^{14}CO_{2} and is depleted in ^{13}CO_{2} relative to CO_{2} in the atmosphere and carbon in the upper ocean and the terrestrial biosphere. It was discovered by and is named for the Austrian chemist Hans Suess, who noted the influence of this effect on the accuracy of radiocarbon dating. More recently, the Suess effect has been used in studies of climate change. The term originally referred only to dilution of atmospheric ^{14}CO_{2} relative to ^{12}CO_{2}. The concept was later extended to dilution of ^{13}CO_{2} and to other reservoirs of carbon such as the oceans and soils, again relative to ^{12}C.

Although the ratio of atmospheric ^{14}CO_{2} to ^{12}CO_{2} decreased over the industrial era (prior to atmospheric testing of nuclear weapons, commencing about 1950), because of the increase, due to fossil fuel emissions, in the amount of atmospheric CO_{2} over this period, roughly 1850 to 1950, the amount of atmospheric ^{14}CO_{2} actually increased over this period.

== Carbon isotopes ==
Carbon has three naturally occurring isotopes. About 99% of carbon on Earth is carbon-12 (^{12}C), about 1% is carbon-13 (^{13}C), and a trace amount is carbon-14 (^{14}C). The ^{12}C and ^{13}C isotopes are stable, while ^{14}C decays radioactively to nitrogen-14 (^{14}N) with a half-life of 5730 years. ^{14}C on Earth is produced nearly exclusively by the interaction of cosmic radiation with the upper atmosphere. A ^{14}C atom is created when a thermal neutron displaces a proton in ^{14}N. Minuscule amounts of ^{14}C are produced by other radioactive processes; a large amount was produced in the atmosphere during nuclear testing before the Limited Test Ban Treaty. Natural ^{14}C production and hence atmospheric concentration varies only slightly over time.

Plants take up ^{14}C by fixing atmospheric carbon through photosynthesis. Animals then take ^{14}C into their bodies when they consume plants (or consume other animals that consume plants). Thus, living plants and animals have nearly the same ratio of ^{14}C to ^{12}C as the atmospheric CO_{2}. Once organisms die they stop exchanging carbon with the atmosphere and thus no longer take up new ^{14}C. This effect is the basis of radiocarbon dating, with the provision that mass-dependent fractionation and the decrease in ^{14}C due to radioactive decay are accounted for.

Photosynthetically fixed carbon in terrestrial plants is depleted in ^{13}C compared to atmospheric CO_{2}. This fractionation of carbon isotopes is caused by kinetic isotope effects and mass dependence of CO_{2} diffusivity. The overall effect is slight in C4 plants but much greater in C3 plants which form the bulk of terrestrial biomass worldwide. Depletion in CAM plants vary between the values observed for C3 and C4 plants. In addition, most fossil fuels originate from C3 biological material produced tens to hundreds of millions of years ago. C4 plants did not become common until about 6 to 8 million years ago, and although CAM photosynthesis is present in modern relatives of the Lepidodendrales of the Carboniferous lowland forests, even if these plants also had CAM photosynthesis they were not a major component of the total biomass.

Fossil fuels such as coal and oil are made primarily of plant material that was deposited millions of years ago. This period of time equates to thousands of half-lives of ^{14}C, so essentially all of the ^{14}C in fossil fuels has decayed. Fossil fuels also are depleted in ^{13}C relative to the atmosphere, because they were originally formed from living organisms. Therefore, the carbon from fossil fuels that is returned to the atmosphere through combustion is depleted in both ^{13}C and ^{14}C compared to atmospheric carbon dioxide.

== See also ==
- Environmental isotopes
- Bomb pulse
