= John Rose (chemist) =

British industrial chemist

John Donald Rose FRS (2 January 1911 – 14 October 1976) was a British industrial chemist, who worked for Imperial Chemical Industries from 1935 to 1972. His posts at ICI included director of research and chairman of the paints division. He was also Master of the Worshipful Company of Salters.

== Life and career ==
Rose was born in Greasbrough, Rotherham, Yorkshire on 2 January 1911 and was educated at Rotherham Grammar School before matriculating at Jesus College, Oxford in 1929 to study chemistry. He graduated with a BA degree in 1932, and spent a further year in study with Robert Robinson to obtain a post-graduate BSc degree in 1933. A two-year fellowship awarded by the Salters' Company allowed him to continue his research with Robinson in Oxford and to spend a year at the Swiss Federal Institute of Technology Zürich with Leopold Ružička on the structure of abietic acid. In 1935, Rose started work as a research chemist for Imperial Chemical Industries in Blackley, Manchester, where his work included evaluating a new polymer called nylon. During the Second World War, Rose was part of a research group considering the possibilities for new business after the war, although plans to use acetylene as an intermediary for making organic chemicals were not pursued when it became clear that it was uneconomic to do so.

In 1949, Rose became associate research manager, and then director of research in 1951; the company's work in this period included research into Procion dyes and Terylene (an artificial fibre). In 1958, he became production director, followed in 1959 by the post of joint managing director (and later chairman) of the paints division. His final appointment within ICI was as research and development director in 1966 (although he spent a period in 1968 to 1969 as chairman of Ilford Photo, which had been acquired jointly by ICI and the Swiss company Ciba). He retired in 1972. He was elected as a Fellow of the Royal Society in 1971 and vice-president of the Society of Chemical Industry in 1968. After his retirement from ICI, he was a director of Laporte Industries and chairman of the Fulmer Research Institute. He was a governor of the University of Salford (and was awarded an honorary DSc in 1972) and Master of the Salters' Company in 1973. He died on 14 October 1976 at his home in Chalfont St Peter.
