= Peter Hooker =

English business

Peter Hooker Limited
- Formerly: Messrs Peter Hooker
- Type: Private limited company
- Industry: Engineering, later aero engine manufacture, gauge manufacture
- Founded: 1827
- Founder: Peter Hooker
- Defunct: 1928
- Successor: Newall Engineering Company Limited (gauge manufacture), High Duty Alloys Limited (some plant)
- Key people: Benjamin Hooker; George Holt Thomas; Hugh Burroughes
- Products: Printing machinery gauges, aero engines (Gnome Monosoupape, Le Rhône), racing car engines
- Brands: Newall Gauges, British Gnôme and Le Rhône Engine Company
- Net income: £200,000 (1919) (1919)
- Owner: George Holt Thomas/Airco (later), BSA (briefly)
- Number of employees: 1,750 (1917) (1917)
- Divisions: British Gnôme and Le Rhône Engine Company, Newall Gauges

Peter Hooker Limited was an engineering business originally established in 1827 and carried on under the name Messrs Peter Hooker (Note: Peter Hooker (1817-1902) Printer's Engineer and inventor (Obituary, page 260, The British Printer, vol. 15, Maclean-Hunter 1902) patents for: railway ticket printing machine, hydraulic guillotine, envelope presser, die stamper etc. Brick-making machinery see Page 13 London Gazette Issue 23487 published on the 13 April 1869.; Benjamin Hooker (1857-1932) Marine Engineer (The Times Feb 05, 1932; pg. 1; Issue 46049 and Jun 23, 1932; pg. 8; Issue 46167)) as printers' engineers at 12 Pump Row, Old Street Road, St Luke's, later at Pear Tree Court, Farringdon Road, London EC. The limited liability company was formed to own it in 1900. Operations were moved to Blackhorse Lane Walthamstow, Essex (now in London), in 1901.

There being insufficient business the Walthamstow site (for sale since 1921) was sold in early 1928 and the company was voluntarily wound up by its then shareholders at the end of the same year.

== Walthamstow ==
The Walthamstow site was very big. Twenty years earlier the business had employed around 20 people. Peter Hooker's youngest son, Benjamin (1857–1932), sat on the board of some public listed companies. George Holt Thomas made a fortune from two popular magazines then began to manufacture aircraft. Perhaps there had been a prior link between Thomas and Benjamin Hooker through printing machinery and they decided the skills needed to make printing machinery might be turned to the new petrol engines then to aero engines.

A summary of a recorded interview of Hugh Burroughes (22 December 1883 – 3 October 1985) archived by The Imperial War Museum (catalogue number 7255, production date 1983) during the period he was Holt Thomas's general manager of Aircraft Manufacturing Company at Hendon (1914–1919) refers to the establishment of a factory to manufacture Gnome engines in Walthamstow, London, 1914. Burroughes remained a significant force active in the aviation industry until he retired from the board of Hawker-Siddeley in 1966 aged 82.

== Newall Gauges ==
The original business of Newall Engineering Company of Atherton's Quay, Warrington, was founded about 1890. It was a pioneer in introducing gauges to the engineering trade which enabled the manufacture of interchangeable component parts by a standard limit system. In 1909 Peter Hooker Limited purchased the complete business: plant, stock, patents and goodwill of Newall. Newall's were by then makers of limit gauges, measuring machines, micrometers, surface plates etc.

During the later part of the war this part of the business was taken over and operated as a National Gauge Factory by the Ministry of Munitions. In February 1919 it was reported in Flight that it had now reverted to Peter Hooker Limited. A new general manager had been appointed R J Bray previously director of the Machine Tool Section, Aircraft Production Department.

== The British Gnôme and Le Rhône Engine Company ==
Peter Hooker Limited used this name on the rotary aero engines it manufactured under licence from the French company, known from the beginning of 1915 as Société des Moteurs Gnome et Rhône. Because the entire engine rotated, they had to be precisely balanced, which necessitated precision machining of all parts, and they were therefore extremely expensive to build.

- Gnome Monosoupape
- Le Rhône

== Expansion 1917 ==
By the middle of 1917 the principal businesses of Peter Hooker Limited, both activities requiring great precision, were the manufacture of aero engines using the name "The British Gnôme and Le Rhône Engine Company" and the manufacture of Newall gauges.

The works of these two businesses at Black Horse Lane, Walthamstow occupied two-thirds of the freehold approximately 26-acre site. At that time numbers employed were workpersons 1,500 and staff 250, a total of 1,750 and the owners were Airco Limited and George Holt Thomas. By this time Peter Hooker Limited needed more capital and went to the stock exchange for it. Financial commentators noted that Hooker's issue of £250,000 of debenture stock to the public in July 1917 met a comparatively poor response when compared with the issue of Straker-Squire Limited, manufacturers of motor vehicles. The Straker-Squire issue was over-subscribed three times but for Hooker's ". . . an appreciable proportion of the amount offered" was not taken up.

- Directors of Peter Hooker Limited at 30 June 1917:

G Holt Thomas (1869-1929), chairman and managing director of Aircraft Manufacturing Co Limited (chairman)
A F Thomas (1872-1956), director of Aircraft Manufacturing Co Limited, retired newspaper publisher
Hugh Burroughes (1883-1985), general manager of Aircraft Manufacturing Co Limited
G A Peck (1885-1964), assistant general manager of Aircraft Manufacturing Co Limited

== Sale to BSA 1920 ==
BSA acquired this whole business from George Holt Thomas and his Airco group in January 1920. It was then discovered that certain contracts with H G Burford & Co and D Napier & Son amounting to more than £1,000,000 were so unremunerative as to involve a probable loss of £250,000. BSA advised they did not intend to carry on the business but would liquidate it.

== Under management of the liquidator until assets sold ==
It was noted by the BSA chairman that the profit of Peter Hooker Limited for the year ended 31 July 1919 had been more than £200,000. In February 1921 the works at Walthamstow and all the plant & machinery were advertised for sale.

Government and the Air Ministry

In September 1922 a town's meeting at Walthamstow asked that the government disregard the Treasury's regulation that no orders be placed with a company in liquidation and place orders for Peter Hooker's newly developed engines.

Marlborough-Thomas

Peter Hooker Limited made a 1.5-litre 8-cylinder racing car engine to his design for J. G. Parry-Thomas's "flat iron" cars.

Stromboli, a giant aeroplane engine

Newspapers reported that the clerk of the Tottenham Council had asked the Air Ministry to arrange further testing of the giant new engine known as Stromboli for daytime or away from London. The 12-cylinder engine could produce more than 1500 horsepower. Airliners fitted with three of them might well be able to carry 100 passengers at more than 100 mph. This engine was intended for airships.

Profit

In May 1926 the chairman of BSA reported to BSA shareholders that Peter Hooker Limited (in liquidation) was continuing in business at a profit under the control of the receiver appointed by the bank. As the assets far exceeded the value of the amount owed to the bank, they were willing for it to continue.

== Sale ==
Not enough business was found in the 1920s to support the retention of their 40-acre site at Walthamstow with its more than 400,000 square feet of workshops built little more than two decades earlier. Operations had ended when the site's sale was completed in early 1928 and the company was voluntarily wound up by its then shareholders towards the end of the same year.

=== Premises ===
Operations finished at the end of 1927 on the agreement of a sale of the Walthamstow works—which had been for sale since 1921. The sale of Straker-Squire's premises at Edmonton was reported in the same item. On 21 January 1928 Messrs Achille Serre, dyers and cleaners, announced they had purchased the premises, and they would shortly be employing more than 2,000 people there

=== Plant to High Duty Alloys ===
The works manager, Wallace Charles Devereux, and some staff took some of the plant to Slough and began High Duty Alloys Limited.

=== Newall Gauges ===
In 1928 this part of the business was bought by Sydney Player who set up a new operation at Ponders End, Essex forming a new company with the old name, Newall Engineering Company Limited. Later, in 1933, he added machine tools to the catalogue of products and transferred operations to Peterborough early in 1935. The principal machine tool products were mechanical lapping machines and thread grinding machines used in all types of precision engineering but particularly in the making of aero and motor car engines.

George Holt Thomas died in 1929. Ben Hooker died in 1932 leaving a substantial estate.
