= Victor Yarsley =

English industrial chemist (1901–1994)

- Born: Victor Emmanuel Yarsley; 1 February 1901; Lichfield, Staffordshire
- Died: 30 June 1994 (aged 93)
- Occupation: Industrial chemist

Victor Yarsley OBE (1 February 1901 – 30 June 1994) was an English industrial chemist.

== Early life and education ==
He was born in Lichfield on 1 February 1901.

Victor Emmanuel Yarsley was the son of a mining colliery manager and a teacher. After attending the village school in Chasetown he won a county scholarship to Queen Mary's Grammar School, Walsall, from where he gained a county major scholarship to Birmingham University to read chemistry, physics and mathematics.

He obtained a first in chemistry in 1923 followed by an MSc a year later and in the same vear was awarded a fellowship by the Salters's Institute of Industrial Chemistry.

After a year at Birmingham studying for a PhD, he transferred to the Eidgenossiche Technische Hochschule in Zurich (ETH Zurich). There he found a more down-to-earth approach to research and his previous field of research activity was summarily dismissed as of little potential industrial value by his professor, Fierz-David, who recommended him to work on the physical properties of cellulose acetate. Yarsley completed his thesis in three years, not without some difficulty for he had to learn German on the way (his thesis was written in German) and survive on a series of small grants.

== Career ==
His almost unique experience with this new material cellulose acetate brought him an invitation to take the post of chief chemist of the Non-inflammable Film Company in 1928. When that company failed in 1931 he set up in business on his own, selling research which he backed up with practical investigation, and operating, initially, from a laboratory in an extension to the garage of his home in Ewell, Surrey. At first much of his work consisted of acting in an advisory capacity in lawsuits involving patent infringement and other such matters.

The small business gradually prospered, in no small part as a result of his Foresight in anticipating industry's needs in promoting the testing and analytical services into a facility serving industry at large. After an expansionary move to Ashtead, Surrey, his company eventually merged with the Fulmer Research Institute. It had a staff of 150 when he relinquished control.

Yarslev was very active in the plastics and polymer group of the Society of Chemical Industry in the 1930s and became its chairman for a year in 1938. He supported the fledgeling Plastics Institute from its beginning in 1931 and became its president From 1953 to 1955. He was chairman of the Plastics Industry Education Fund For many years.

For 25 years from 1935, Yarsley was a monthly contributor on plastics to The Times Review of Industry and the author of several books. The Penguin books he wrote with E.G.Couzens: Plastics in 1941 and its revisions Plastics in the Service of Man and Plastics in the Modern World became bestsellers of their type and gave many a non-plastics scientist and engineer, and indeed many a layman, an excellent insight into the nature and characteristics of these mysterious materials. Yarsley strove for their acceptance as materials in their own right and not just as substitutes or ersatz products, to be replaced by others when times got better.

== Awards ==
Yarsley was appointed as OBE in 1982 for services to the plastics industry. He was a member of the Worshipful Company of Horners, which early on took the plastics industry under its wing.

In his younger days he was an active and sincere freemason, becoming in turn the master of two lodges.

== Personal life ==
Victor Yarsley married in 1928 Louise Sandmeier, whom he met while in Zurich and who predeceased him.

He died on 30 June 1994 aged 93 and is survived by a daughter.
