= British Non-Ferrous Metals Research Association =

20th-century research consortium in the UK

Coordinates: 51.527°N 0.136°W

- Formation: 1920; 106 years ago
- Purpose: Research association for metallurgy
- Location: Wantage, Oxfordshire, United Kingdom
- Region served: Worldwide

The British Non-Ferrous Metals Research Association (officially abbreviated as B.N.F.M.R.A. but commonly as BNF) was a research group active the United Kingdom during the 20th century, bringing together public and privately funded research into metallurgy.

It was formed in January 1920 by members of the British Non-Ferrous Metals Federation, which represented the commercial interests of British manufacturers of coppers and copper alloys, lead, zinc and other non-ferrous metals and their alloys, latterly including titanium. The BNF's function was to furthern scientific development and facilitate collaborative research. It was headquartered in Birmingham while its most prominent laboratory was in London; the laboratories were grouped into specialties. It was partially funded by the Department of Scientific and Industrial Research (DSIR).

The BNF was involved in numerous critical research projects during the Second World War, including the development of nuclear weapons. In 1990, it bought Fulmer Research Laboratories, which was permanently shuttered two years later. During the late 1990s, it was revealed that an BNF employee, Melita Norwood, had been leaking classified documents to the Soviet Union.

== History ==
The origins of the British Non-Ferrous Metals Research Association (BNF) can be traced back to the First World War. Specifically, the urgent wartime demands placed upon numerous British manufacturers came to convince numerous senior figures that there was an important need to obtain further knowledge and foster further development in respect to the various metals and alloys that were being made use of. To this end, in late 1918, preliminary meetings were held, attended by numerous representatives across Britain's non-ferrous metal producers, along with various associated industries. These included (but were not limited to) smelters, foundries, tube manufacturers, and metal rollers across virtually all industrial alloys, including of precious metals. These discussions continued into 1919. The efforts was strengthened by Parliament approval of a £1 million fund to support industrial research and a corresponding scheme for the establishment of research associations connected with various industries, which typically each received a grant for five years on a fifty-fifty basis towards their expenses.

In January 1920, the BNF was officially incorporated; its headquarters was established in Birmingham, which was the most active British city for the non-ferrous metals sector. Robert Hutton was appointed director in 1921, while Thomas Bolton served as chairman between 1920 and 1937. Operationally, it acted to support and grow the sector by promoting scientific development and facilitating co-operative research, including the provision of appropriate facilities for such projects to be performed within.

The BNF undertook valuable work during the Second World War in support of Britain's defence industry. One specific example was the resolution of numerous corrosion-related issues encountered by seawater-cooled condenser tubes and tube plates, which had resulted in many ships becoming unserviceable and significant improvements in corrosion-resistant alloys for seawater pumps and pipe fittings. Amongst other activities, it played a central role in the research effort towards the development of nuclear weapons.

Between late 1930s to the 1960s, the BNF's director was Mr G. L. Bailey with Miss E. M. (Helen) Hills as his secretary.

== Membership and funding ==
By 1930, the BNF had nearly 300 subscribing members. At its height, the organisation had around 600 subscribing members. These members formed Industry Committees representing each of the main metal interests, which discussed and agreed the topics for technical work to be done and a Council that controlled overall finances.

Early on, the BNF was a recipient of an annual grant provided by the Department of Scientific and Industrial Research (DSIR); by the late 1930s, by which point the organisation had a total income in excess of £30,000 per year, roughly one third of which was being provided by the British government; reportedly, the grant scaled in relation to the industrial income produced. At some point, this funding model was radically changed; instead, funding was directed to the individual projects themselves. When topics for research were agreed and funded by the industry they were then submitted to the government for approval of matching support funding but, after the 1960s, policy dictated that this became more and more difficult to obtain. The BNF also took on some contracts wholly sponsored by organisations, which included some government departments. Individual technical enquiries from members were answered on a free and confidential basis.

== Laboratories ==
For many years after the new art deco fronted building was opened in 1939 the work was carried out in laboratories fronting on Euston Street, London, NW1. These included three parallel four-story blocks of laboratories and offices with the basements being used for the heaviest equipment and for storage of samples. The Euston Street building was extended to the right of the main entrance making the address 81–103 Euston Street, with the laboratories behind being in Regnart Buildings and Euston Buildings which fronted on Stephenson Way. The extension was opened on 13 May 1959 by Sir Alexander Fleck. In the mid-1950s, Prince Philip, Duke of Edinburgh toured all departments.

The laboratories were grouped in specialist sections, including analytical chemistry, corrosion, creep testing, electroplating, fatigue testing, general metallurgy, information library, mechanical testing, melting and casting, members liaison, metallography, metal working, physics (X-ray crystallography), and spectrography.

The laboratories were an excellent training ground both for assistants who studied for their qualifications part-time and for recent graduates from universities. As such, members found that staff could be ideal recruits for industrial work. There were around 150–200 staff and the average time for researchers to stay was about three years and they could then be found in industries in Britain and worldwide.

== Reports ==
There was a quarterly report on each research topic presented to the individual research committee and an annual one circulated also to members on request. Final results were compiled as a report that was immediately available to members. After about two years, the commercial confidentiality was dropped and a paper was presented at a meeting of the Institute of Metals or other organisation and subsequently published in their journal. Some researches that had resulted in valuable definitive advancements were then published in book form.

During 1932, Melita Norwood (née Sirnis) joined the BNF in 1932 as a clerk, was promoted to secretary, and retired in 1972. While working as a secretary to a research superintendent, Norwood had access to papers prepared at the BNF for presentation to both research committees and contractors. Norwood chose to supply a number of these documents to Soviet intelligence agents, and subsequently claimed that her unauthorised disclosures of classified information had helped to avert the possibility of a third world war. This information was made use of by them and did occasionally result in one of their research organisations publishing development work on non-ferrous metals similar to and sooner than the BNF in Britain.

== BNF-Fulmer ==
During the 1970s, the BNF became the BNF Metals Technology Centre and relocated from London to Grove Laboratories, Denchworth Road, Wantage, Oxfordshire. Recognising the growing importance of international research partnerships, membership was expanded to include companies based overseas.

In 1990, the BNF purchased Fulmer Research Laboratories from the Institute of Physics, and was rebranded as BNF-Fulmer, then BNF (Fulmer Materials Centre). However, due to limited funding being available, the laboratories were permanently closed in 1992.
