= Wallace Charles Devereux =

Innovative Engineer and Businessman

- Born: 9 March 1893
- Died: 21 June 1952 (aged 59)
- Title: Colonel
- Children: Ethne Devereux (daughter, 1918–1994) Wallace Deane Devereux (son, 1920-2005)

Wallace Charles Devereux CBE (9 March 1893 – 21 June 1952) was a British businessman and engineer, known for his work in producing light alloys for the aircraft industry.

== Education ==
He was born in Aston, now part of Birmingham, in 1893, then educated at Erdington High School. He then studied for three years at Birmingham School of Art, the subjects including machine design and metallurgy.

== First World War ==
During the First World War, Devereux was appointed to the post of tool room superintendent of National Aircraft Factory No. 1. His study of airframe and engine design during this period, and in the years immediately following the war, convinced him of the possibilities of forged light alloys. Aircraft airframes, as well as engines, were now in a transitional phase and moving to the increased use of light alloys for construction, rather than wood or iron.

== Between the wars ==
Following the end of the war he became works manager at Peter Hooker's where he began to realise the increasing value of light alloy forgings and castings. During WWI, Hooker's had licence-built the Gnôme engine, amongst other things, and for the aero engines chose to be known as The British Gnôme and Le Rhône Engine Co. They had become expert at working Y alloy, the first heat-resistant aluminium alloy, which had become important for making engine parts, particularly pistons.

The post-war reduction in demand and the plentiful supply of war-surplus engines made times hard for all engine and component makers. After buying Hooker's at the beginning of 1920, BSA reviewed its operations and decided Hooker's should be liquidated. After some years in voluntary liquidation, Hooker's operations ended in late 1927 when its workshops were sold.

In 1927 Devereux founded High Duty Alloys Ltd. at Farnham Road, Slough Initial backing for this had been provided by John Siddeley of Armstrong-Siddeley, who were already significant early adopters of aluminium castings for car engine parts. About that time a large order was received, of some thousands of pistons for the Armstrong Siddeley Jaguar engine. Armstrong-Siddeley had no other capable source for these pistons, so Devereux proposed to set up a new company to complete this order. Siddeley loaned the money to re-purchase the necessary equipment and re-employ some of the staff from Hooker. As the buildings had already been sold, the new company had to relocate to Slough. High Duty Alloys began as a small company, but was equipped for applied research with a well-equipped laboratory, foundry, and machine shop. Much of their early work was still on Y alloy and then on 'DU' from which Hiduminium was developed. In 1935 Hawker Siddeley Aircraft was formed, when Hawker Aircraft purchased the business empire of the retiring 70-year-old John Siddeley, including High Duty Alloys.

In 1933 he was elected an Associate Fellow of the Royal Aeronautical Society, followed by a Fellowship in 1937. In 1938 he became the Honorary Colonel of the 56th (1st London) Divisional Engineers of the Royal Engineers, succeeding Sir Samuel G. Joseph.

In 1938 Devereux assisted the automotive engineer Stewart Tresilian to set up his Templewood Engineering consultancy, to sell High Duty Alloys' products into the motor and motor-racing industries. This also encouraged the development of these alloys as extrusions, and the development of alloys more suitable for extrusion.

== World War II ==
When World War II broke out, Devereux was appointed Director of Forgings and Castings at the Ministry of Aircraft Production. In 1941 he was made controller of North American Aircraft Supply, and responsible for the receipt, assembly and repair of American aircraft supplied under Lend-Lease.

== Personal life ==
When war ended he returned once more to the metallurgical research side of engineering, and among his enterprises in 1945 were the founding of the Fulmer Research Institute at Stoke Poges and the Associated Light Metal Industries Group (Almin).

He was awarded the CBE in 1949 in recognition of his services to research and industry. He was a Fellow of the Royal Aeronautical Society and, in 1952 was elected vice-chairman of the Royal Aero Club. For the second time he became an Honorary Colonel, of the newly reformed as a Territorial regiment, the 114 (1st London) Army Engineer Regiment, Royal Engineers. He was also a liveryman of the Worshipful Company of Coachmakers and Coach Harness Makers and a member of the Royal Institution of Naval Architects. From 1939 he had been elected a Life Fellow of the Royal Society of Arts.

Post-war he lived at 'Meads', on the Stoke Park estate, Buckinghamshire. He also owned Round Hill Farm, a Dairy Shorthorn farm at Kimble, Buckinghamshire. This farm was one of the first to adopt artificial insemination in the UK.

He hunted, aided by his daughter, Ethne. In 1946 he was the master of the Old Berkeley Hunt (West) and joint master of the South Oxfordshire Hunt. Ethne Gamble, (née Devereux) (1918–1994), lived at the farm until her death, aged 76.

He fell ill at Ascot on 21 June 1952 and died at home at Stoke Park the same day.
