= Ann Pearson =

- Born: 1971 (age 54–55); Seattle, WA
- Title: PVK Professor of Arts & Sciences, Murray and Martha Ross Professor of Environmental Sciences

Academic background
- Education: MIT/WHOI, Oberlin College
- Thesis: (2000)

Academic work
- Discipline: Biogeochemistry
- Institutions: Harvard University

Ann Pearson (born 1971) is the PVK Professor of Arts and Sciences and Murray and Martha Ross Professor of Environmental Sciences at Harvard University and former chair of the Department of Earth and Planetary Sciences. Her research in the area of organic geochemistry is focused on applications of analytical chemistry, isotope geochemistry, and microbiology to biogeochemistry and Earth history.

== Education ==
After growing up on the San Juan Islands, Pearson completed her undergraduate degree in chemistry from Oberlin College, Oberlin, Ohio in 1992. She was a Peace Corps volunteer in Ecuador from 1993 to 1994. She earned her Ph.D. in Chemical Oceanography from the MIT/WHOI Joint Program in Oceanography with a dissertation titled "Biogeochemical applications of compound-specific radiocarbon analysis" for which she received MIT's Rossby Award.

== Career and research ==
Pearson has been on the Harvard faculty since 2001. She was the first woman in the Earth and Planetary Sciences Department to be appointed to a tenured position.

Pearson's recent work has focused on the global carbon and nitrogen cycles, paleo-temperatures, and paleo-CO_{2} records. In 2010, Pearson described her research as "...the 'you are what you eat' philosophy for microbes" which allows her to use their chemical and isotopic fingerprints to assess modern and ancient ecosystems. Notable research topics include investigations into chemoautotrophic processes using compound specific ^{14}C-based methods, genomic evidence of sterol biosynthesis retained by Planctomycetota, and examinations of modern environments to reveal insights into environmental conditions in the past. In 2018, Pearson's research showed that increases in the size of eukaryotic phytoplankton increased the amount of carbon sequestered from the atmosphere.

== Awards and honors ==
- Fellow, Packard Foundation (2004)
- Radcliffe Institute Fellow (2009-2010)
- Gordon and Betty Moore Foundation Investigator (2013–2019)
- Paul W. Gast lecture, Geochemical Society (2015)
- Benjamin Meaker Visiting Professor, University of Bristol (2018)
- Fellow, American Geophysical Union (2019)
- John Hayes Award, Geochemical Society (2019)
- Joanne Simpson Medal, American Geophysical Union (2019)
- Geochemistry Fellow, Geochemical Society and the European Association of Geochemistry (2022)
- Fellow, National Academy of Sciences USA (2024)
