= Standard Gibbs free energy of formation =

Change in energy from formation of 1 mole of substance

The standard Gibbs free energy of formation (G_{f}°) of a compound is the change of Gibbs free energy that accompanies the formation of 1 mole of a substance in its standard state from its constituent elements in their standard states (the most stable form of the element at 1 bar of pressure and the specified temperature, usually 298.15 K or 25 °C).

The table below lists the standard Gibbs function of formation for several elements and chemical compounds and is taken from Lange's Handbook of Chemistry. Note that all values are in kJ/mol. Far more extensive tables can be found in the CRC Handbook of Chemistry and Physics and the NIST JANAF tables. The NIST Chemistry WebBook (see link below) is an online resource that contains standard enthalpy of formation for various compounds along with the standard molar entropy for these compounds from which the standard Gibbs free energy of formation can be calculated.

Species	Phase (matter)	Chemical formula	ΔG_{f}° (kJ/mol)
Aluminum
Aluminum	Solid	Al	0
Aluminum chloride	Solid	AlCl_{3}	−628.9
Aluminum oxide	Solid	Al_{2}O_{3}	−1582.3
Barium
Barium	Solid	Ba	0
Barium chloride	Solid	BaCl_{2}	−806.7
Barium carbonate	Solid	BaCO_{3}	−1134.4
Barium oxide	Solid	BaO	−520.4
Barium sulfate	Solid	BaSO_{4}	−1362.2
Beryllium
Beryllium	Solid	Be	0
Beryllium hydroxide	Solid	Be(OH)_{2}	−815.0
Boron
Boron trichloride	Solid	BCl_{3}	−388.7
Bromine
Bromine	Liquid	Br_{2}	0
Bromine trifluoride	Gas	BrF_{3}	−229.4
Hydrobromic acid	Gas	HBr	−53.4
Calcium
Calcium	Solid	Ca	0
Calcium carbide	Solid	CaC_{2}	−64.9
Calcium carbonate (Calcite)	Solid	CaCO_{3}	−1129.1
Calcium chloride	Solid	CaCl_{2}	−748.8
Calcium chloride	Aqueous	CaCl_{2}	−816.05
Calcium hydride	Solid	CaH_{2}	−142.5
Calcium hydroxide	Solid	Ca(OH)_{2}	−897.5
Calcium oxide	Solid	CaO	−603.3
Calcium sulfate	Solid	CaSO_{4}	−1309.1
Calcium sulfide	Solid	CaS	−477.4
Carbon
Carbon (graphite)	Solid	C	0
Carbon (diamond)	Solid	C	2.900
Carbon dioxide	Gas	CO_{2}	−394.39
Carbonic acid	Aqueous	H_{2}CO_{3}	−623.1
Bicarbonate	Aqueous	HCO_{3}^{−}	−586.85
Carbonate ion	Aqueous	CO_{3}^{2−}	−527.8
Carbon disulfide	Gas	CS_{2}	67.1
Carbon monoxide	Gas	CO	−137.16
Glucose	Solid	C_{6}H_{12}O_{6}	−910.56
Ethanol	Liquid	C_{2}H_{5}OH	−174.8
Carbonyl chloride (phosgene)	Gas	COCl_{2}	−204.9
Caesium
Caesium	Solid	Cs	0
Caesium chloride	Solid	CsCl	−414.4
Chlorine
Chlorine	Gas	Cl_{2}	0
Chromium
Chromium	Solid	Cr	0
Copper
Copper	Solid	Cu	0
Copper(I) sulfide	Solid	Cu_{2}S	−86.2
Fluorine
Fluorine	Gas	F_{2}	0
Hydrogen
Hydrogen	Gas	H_{2}	0
Water	Liquid	H_{2}O	−237.14
Water	Gas	H_{2}O	−228.61
Hydrogen peroxide	Liquid	H_{2}O_{2}	−120.42
Hydrogen cyanide	Gas	HCN	+124.7
Hydrogen iodide	Gas	HI	+1.3
Hydrogen fluoride	Gas	HF	−275.4
Hydrogen chloride	Gas	HCl	−95.30
Iodine
Iodine	Solid	I_{2}	0
Iodine	Gas	I_{2}	19.37
Iron
Lead
Lithium
Magnesium
Magnesium carbonate	Solid	MgCO_{3}	−1012.1
Magnesium chloride	Solid	MgCl_{2}	−591.8
Magnesium hydroxide	Solid	Mg(OH)_{2}	−833.7
Magnesium hydroxide	Aqueous	Mg(OH)_{2}	−769.4
Magnesium oxide	Solid	MgO	−596.3
Magnesium sulfate	Solid	MgSO_{4}	−1170.6
Manganese
Manganese(II) oxide	Solid	MnO	−362.9
Manganese(IV) oxide	Solid	MnO_{2}	−465.2
Mercury
Mercury(II) oxide (red)	Solid	HgO	−58.49
Mercury sulfide (red, cinnabar)	Solid	HgS	−50.6
Nickel
Nitrogen
Ammonia	Aqueous	NH_{3}	−26.57
Ammonia	Gas	NH_{3}	−16.4
Ammonium chloride	Solid	NH_{4}Cl	−203.89
Nitrogen dioxide	Gas	NO_{2}	51.3
Nitrogen monoxide	Gas	NO	87.60
Oxygen
Monatomic oxygen	Gas	O	231.7
Dioxygen	Gas	O_{2}	0
Ozone	Gas	O_{3}	163.2
Hydroxide	Aqueous	OH^{−}	−157.2
Phosphorus
Phosphorus trichloride	Liquid	PCl_{3}	−272.4
Potassium
Potassium bromide	Solid	KBr	−380.7
Potassium chlorate	Solid	KClO_{3}	−296.31
Potassium chloride	Solid	KCl	−408.5
Potassium fluoride	Solid	KF	−537.8
Potassium perchlorate	Solid	KClO_{4}	−303.1
Silicon
Silica (quartz)	Solid	SiO_{2}	−856.4
Silver
Silver bromide	Solid	AgBr	−96.90
Silver chloride	Solid	AgCl	−109.8
Silver iodide	Solid	AgI	−66.19
Silver oxide	Solid	Ag_{2}O	−11.21
Silver sulfide	Solid	Ag_{2}S	−40.67
Sodium
Sodium carbonate	Solid	Na_{2}CO_{3}	−1044.4
Sodium carbonate	Aqueous	Na_{2}CO_{3}	−1051.6
Sodium chloride	Aqueous	NaCl	−393.17
Sodium chloride	Solid	NaCl	−384.1
Sodium fluoride	Solid	NaF	−546.3
Sodium hydroxide	Aqueous	NaOH	−419.2
Sodium hydroxide	Solid	NaOH	−379.4
Sodium nitrate	Aqueous	NaNO_{3}	−373.21
Sodium nitrate	Solid	NaNO_{3}	−367.06
Sulfur
Hydrogen sulfide	Gas	H_{2}S	−33.4
Sulfur dioxide	Gas	SO_{2}	−300.13
Sulfur trioxide	Gas	SO_{3}	−370.4
Sulfuric acid	Liquid	H_{2}SO_{4}	−689.9
Tin
Titanium
Zinc

== See also ==
- Thermochemistry
- Calorimetry
