= Pakistan Standards & Quality Control Authority =

Govt. of Pakistan agency for standards & metrology.

- PSQCA

Agency overview
- Formed: 1996; 30 years ago (In its current statute); 1951; 75 years ago (As Pakistan Standards Institute)
- Preceding agency: Standards Development Centre (1951)
- Type: Regulatory
- Jurisdiction: Government of Pakistan
- Headquarters: Islamabad, Pakistan
- Motto: Pakistan Standards!
- Annual budget: FY-26 federal budget
- Agency executive: Dr. Sayeda Batool Director-General
- Parent agency: Ministry of Science & Technology
- Key document: PSQCA Act of 1996
- Website: www.psqca.com.pk

The Pakistan Standards & Quality Control Authority (PSQCA), best known as Pakistan Standards ) is an independent federal agency under the Ministry of Science and Technology (MOST) whose mission is to regulate the quality assurance and control by through the promotion of science and fostering to regulate the importance of metrology which is essential for Pakistan's innovation and economic uplift.

Certification of the Pakistan brands are issued by the agency as Pakistan Standards (PS) label.

== History ==
In 1950, the Ali Khan administration announced to establish the "Pakistan Standards Institute" to ensure the supply of standard quality goods. In 1951, the "Pakistan Standards Institute" was established under the Ministry of Industry (MoI) and was responsible for preparing and establishing national standards for the developing industries.

The PSQCA was formed through the passage of the Pakistan Standards and Quality Control Authority Act, 1996 by the Parliament of Pakistan.

On 16 February 2022, the Senate Standing Committee on Science and Technology approved transfer of head office of Pakistan Standards and Quality Control Authority (PSQCA) to Islamabad from Karachi.

== Organization ==
The Authority is composed of the following four departments:

=== Standards Development Center ===
The Directorate of Standards, also known as Standards Development Centre, SDC is responsible for the development of Pakistan Standards, adoption of International Standards by consensus involving Stakeholders (manufacturers, government and regulatory bodies, consumers, scientists and technologists, academia and testing laboratories) through its technical divisions.

==== Organization ====
SDC has 177 Technical Committees along with 12 technical divisions. Technical divisions are:

- Agriculture and Food Division
- Automobile Division (formed; 2014)
- Chemical Division
- Civil Division
- Electrical Division
- Electronics Division
- Halaal Division
- Information Technology (IT) and Information Communication Technology (ICT), Division
- Management Standards System (MSS)
- Mechanical Division
- Textile Division
- Weights & Measure Division

==== Achievements ====
SDC has established 6094 Pakistan Standards, and adopted 9185 ISO, 6202 IEC, 2 OIML, 634 ASTM, 21 Codex Alimentarius (CAC) and 15 Food and Agriculture Organization (FAO) Standards.

=== Quality Control Center ===
The Quality Control Centre (QCC) is a multifunctional testing laboratory which test quality of food, building materials (cement), papers & textiles, sugar, Microbiology, beverages and Water. QCC is organized in six sections. It can test 107 different items, including 38 food, 28 electrical, 02 auto vehicles, 03 animal feed, 3 textile, 14 civil/building materials, 6 washing/cosmetics, 2 steel, 9 chemical division and 4 fertilizer items.

==== History ====
The formal Central Testing Laboratory merged into Pakistan Standards Quality Control Authority under Act VI of 1996, after the Promulgation of the Pakistan Standards Quality Control Authority and was renamed as Quality Control Centre. In 2014, all labs of Quality Control Centre(QCC Karachi) i.e. Microbiology, Water & beverages lab, Sugar Lab, Oil & Fats and Building Material (Cement) Lab were accredited.

==== Organization ====
Quality control centers are located at Karachi (with chemical, microbiology and physical sections), Lahore (chemical, microbiology and physical sections), Peshawar (chemical, microbiology and physical sections) and Quetta (chemical section).

== International activities ==
=== Affiliations ===
PSQCA is a member of the following international organizations:

- International Organization for Standardization
- International Electrotechnical Commission
- International Organization of Legal Metrology
- World Trade Organization
- IECEE/CEE

=== Relations with foreign nations and organisation ===
PSQCA has memorandum of understandings (MoUs) with following countries:

- Algeria
- Morocco
- Saudi Arabia
- Sri Lanka

PSQCA has established relations with following organizations:

- American National Standards Institute
- ASTM International
- Deutsches Institut für Normung
