= Y alloy =

Aluminum alloy

Y alloy is a nickel-containing aluminium alloy. It was developed by the British National Physical Laboratory during World War I, in an attempt to find an aluminium alloy that would retain its strength at high temperatures.

Duralumin, an aluminium alloy containing 4% copper, was already known at this time. Its strength and its previously unknown age hardening behaviour had made it a popular choice for zeppelins. Aircraft of the period were largely constructed of wood, but there was a need for an aluminium alloy suitable for making engines, particularly pistons, that would have the strength of duralumin but could retain this when in service at high temperatures for long periods.

The National Physical Laboratory began a series of experiments to study new aluminium alloys. Experimental series "Y" was successful, and gave its name to the new alloy. Like duralumin, this was a 4% copper alloy, but with the addition of 2% nickel and 1.5% magnesium. This addition of nickel was an innovation for aluminium alloys. These alloys are one of the three main groups of high-strength aluminium alloys, the nickel–aluminium alloys having the advantage of retaining strength at high temperatures.

The alloy was first used in the cast form, but was soon used for forging as well. One of the most pressing needs was to develop reliable pistons for aircraft engines. The first experts at forging this alloy were Peter Hooker Limited of Walthamstow, who were better known as The British Gnôme and Le Rhône Engine Co. They license-built the Gnome engine and fitted it with pistons of Y alloy, rather than their previous cast iron. These pistons were highly successful, although impressions of the alloy as a panacea suitable for all applications were less successful; a Gnôme cylinder in Y alloy failed on its first revolution. Frank Halford used connecting rods of this alloy for his de Havilland Gipsy engine, but these other uses failed to impress Rod Banks.

Air Ministry Specification D.T.D 58A of April 1927 specified the composition and heat treatment of wrought Y alloy. The alloy became extremely important for pistons, and for engine components in general, but was little used for structural members of airframes.

In the late 1920s, further research on nickel-aluminium alloys gave rise to the successful Hiduminium or "R.R. alloys", developed by Rolls-Royce.

== Alloy composition ==
Composition
Aluminium	92.5%
Copper	4.0%
Nickel	2.0%
Magnesium	1.5%

=== Heat treatment ===
As for many of the aluminium alloys, Y alloy age hardens spontaneously at normal temperatures after solution heat treating. The heat treatment is to heat it to 500 to 520 °C (932 to 968 °F) for 6 hours, then to allow it to age naturally for 7–10 days. The precipitation hardening that takes place during this ageing forms precipitates of both CuAl_{2} and NiAl_{3}.

The times required depend on the grain structure of the alloy. Forged parts have the coarsest eutectic masses and so take the longest times. When cast, chill casting is favoured over sand casting as this gives a finer structure that is more amenable to heat treatment.

== See also ==
- 2218 aluminium alloy
