= Hiduminium =

Aluminum alloy

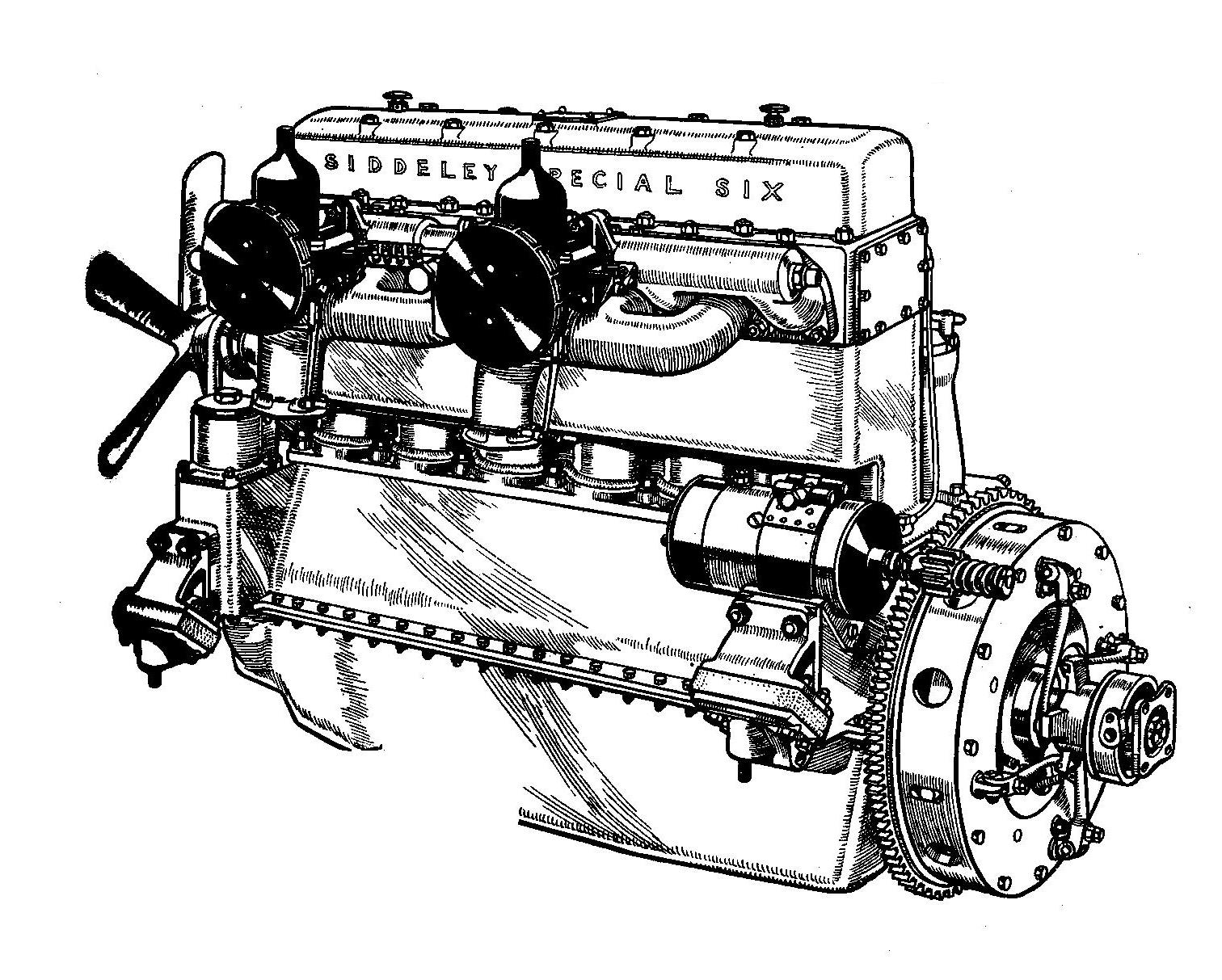
Six cylinder, 5 litre, all-Hiduminium engine for the 1933 Siddeley Special Six

Hiduminium is a proprietary term for a range of high-strength, high-temperature aluminium alloys, developed for aircraft use by Rolls-Royce before World War II. Also known as "R.R." and "RR" alloys after Rolls-Royce, they were manufactured and later developed by High Duty Alloys Ltd. The name Hi-Du-Minium is derived from that of High Duty Aluminium Alloys.

The first of these Hiduminium alloys was termed 'R.R.50' . This alloy was first developed for motor-racing pistons, and was only later adopted for aircraft engine use. It was a development of the earlier Y alloy, the first of the nickel-containing light aluminium alloys. These alloys are one of the three main groups of high-strength aluminium alloys, the nickel-aluminium alloys having the advantage of retaining strength at high temperatures, making them particularly useful for pistons.

== History ==
=== High Duty Alloys Ltd. ===
High Duty Alloys Ltd. was founded at Farnham Road, Slough in 1927, by Colonel W. C. Devereux.

The company began from the ruins of the World War I aero engine builder, Peter Hooker Limited of Walthamstow. Hookers licence-built the Gnôme engine, amongst other things, and for the aero engines chose to be known as The British Gnôme and Le Rhône Engine Co. They had become expert at working Y alloy. The post-war reduction in demand and the plentiful supply of war-surplus engines made times hard for all engine and component makers. After buying it at the beginning of 1920 BSA reviewed its operations and decided Hooker's should be liquidated.

In 1921 or 1922 a large order of some thousands of pistons for the Y-alloy Armstrong Siddeley Jaguar radial aero engine was received. Armstrong Siddeley had no other capable source for its pistons, so W.C. Devereux, works manager of Hooker, proposed to set up a new company, High Duty Alloys Ltd, to complete this order. John Siddeley loaned the money to re-purchase the necessary equipment and re-employ some of the staff from Hooker. As the buildings had already been sold, the new company found premises in Slough.

=== Early aircraft adoption ===
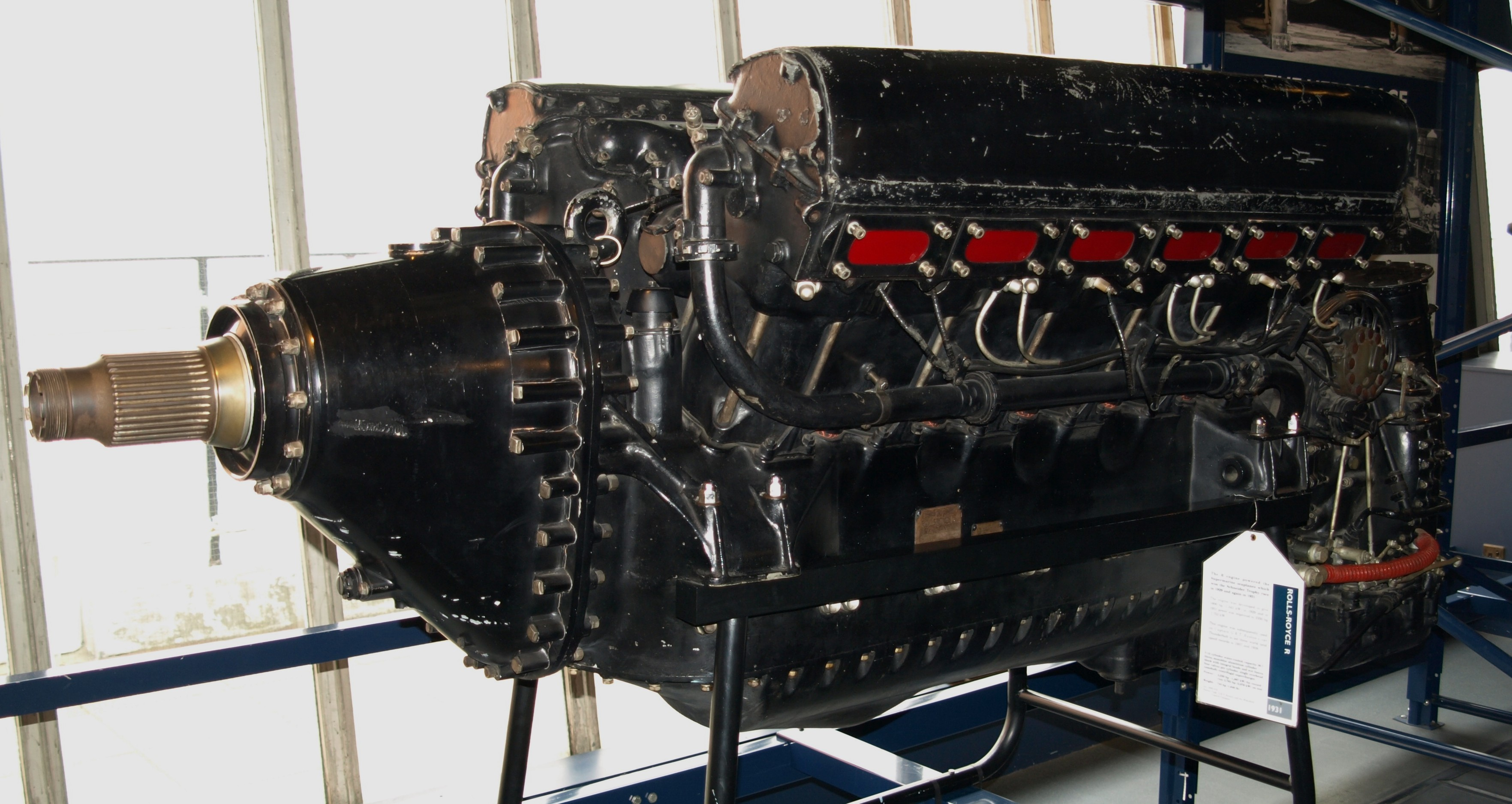
A Rolls-Royce R aero engine, introduced in 1929

High Duty Alloys were in limited use for aircraft by 1929, being used in the Rolls-Royce R engine that was successful in the Schneider Trophy seaplane races. They quickly spread to other manufacturers, in 1931 being adopted by ABC for their Hornet engine. R.R.50 alloy was used for the crankcase, R.R.53 for the pistons.

Their first mass production use was in the Siddeley Special Six saloon car of 1933. Armstrong Siddeley already having had experience with the alloy, and financial investment in its manufacturer, from their aero engine business.

Advantages of these alloys were recognised worldwide. When 576 pistons in Hiduminium R.R.59 alloy were used for the Italian Marshal Balbo's 1933 mass trans-Atlantic Decennial Air Cruise, High Duty Alloys used it in their own advertising.

As well as producing ingots of raw alloy, manufacturing included the initial forging or casting processes. Finish machining would be undertaken by the customer. Hiduminium was so successful that during World War II it was in use by all of the major British aero engine makers.

In 1934 the Reynolds Tube Co. began production of extruded structural components for airframes, using R.R.56 alloy supplied by High Duty Alloys. A new purpose-built plant was constructed at their works in Tyseley, Birmingham.

=== World War II and Postwar ===
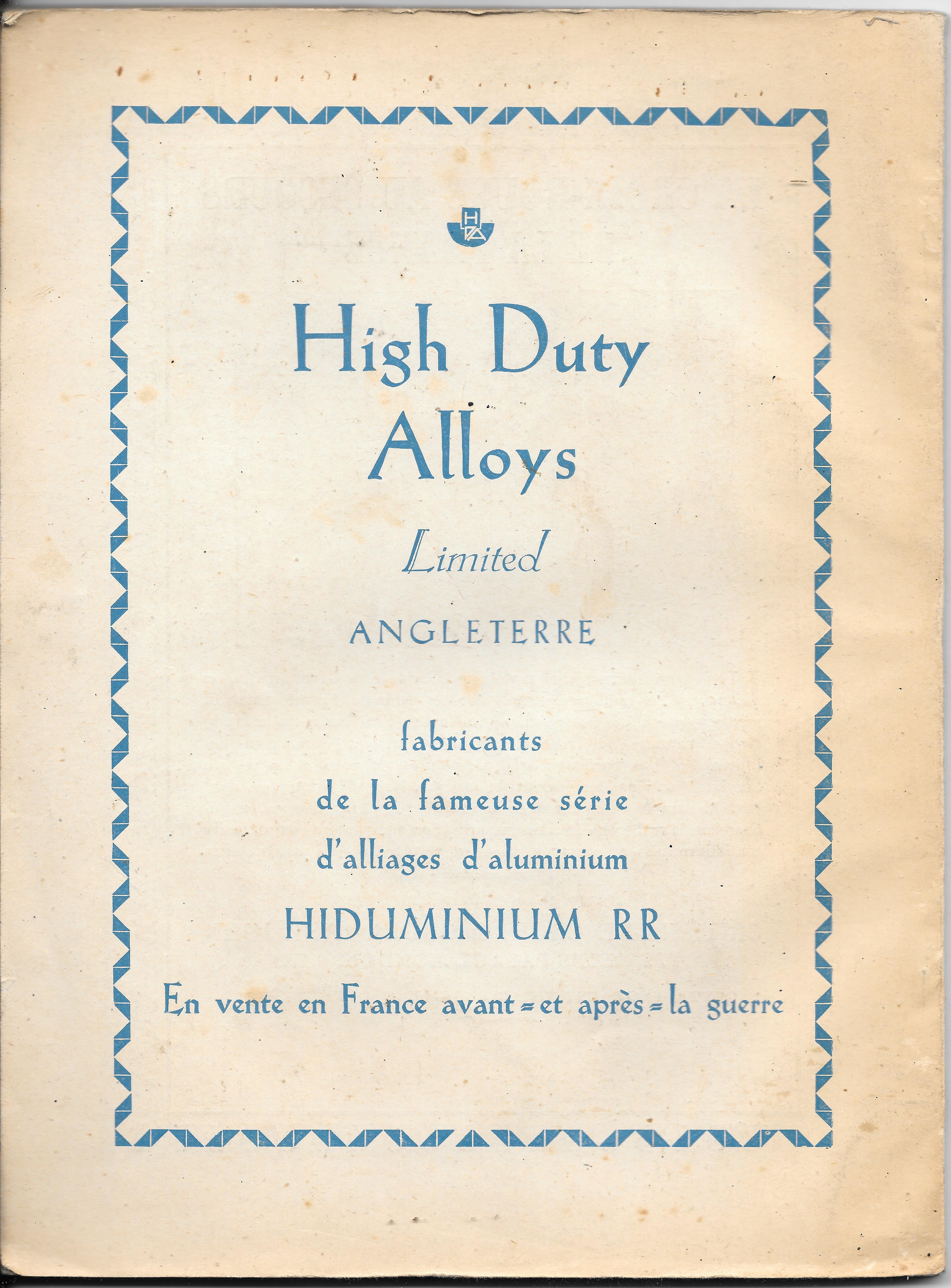
Advertisement in La France Libre - October 1944.

Demand from Rolls-Royce later led to expansion into a factory at Redditch. These materials were so crucial to aircraft production that with the outbreak of World War II a shadow factory was established in the remote area of Cumberland (now Cumbria), at Distington, near Whitehaven.

In time, the post-war Reynolds company, already known for its steel bicycle frame tubes, would attempt to survive in the peacetime market by supplying Hiduminium alloy components for high-end aluminium bicycle cranks and brakes.

=== In jet engines ===
The impeller (compressor) and compressor casing of the 1937 Power Jets WU jet engine was made from RR.56 and RR.55 respectively. In the subsequent Power Jets W.1 the compressor material was changed to RR.59. By 1943 the de Havilland Goblin, the first British production jet engine to be built in large numbers, was in development. The centrifugal compressor for this began as a 500 lb 'cheese' of RR.50, the largest forging made of it. After machining, these were reduced to 109 lbs. The size of this forging was so great that cooling rates in its centre affected the metallurgical properties of the alloy; Devereux advised the reduction of the silicon content to below 0.25% and this low silicon RR.50 alloy was used throughout Goblin production.

=== Other uses ===
The 1,600 Olympic torches for the 1948 London Olympics were cast by the company.

== Properties ==
=== Alloy composition ===
The Duralumin alloys had already demonstrated high-strength aluminium alloys. Y alloy's virtue was its ability to maintain high strength at high temperatures. R.R alloys were developed by Hall & Bradbury at Rolls-Royce, partly to simplify the manufacture of components using them. A deliberate heat treatment process of multiple steps was used to control their physical properties.

In terms of composition, Y alloy typically contains 4% of copper and 2% of nickel. R.R. alloys reduce each of these by half to 2% and 1%, and 1% of iron is introduced.

Example composition:

R.R.56
Melting point	635 °C
Density	2.75
Composition
Aluminium	93.7%
Copper	2.0%
Iron	1.4%
Nickel	1.3%
Magnesium	0.8%
Silicon	0.7%
Titanium	0.1%

=== Heat treatment ===
As for many of the aluminium alloys, Y alloy age hardens spontaneously at normal temperatures after solution heat treating. In contrast, R.R. alloys remain soft afterwards, until deliberately heat treated again by precipitation hardening for artificial ageing. This simplifies their machining in the soft state, particularly where component blanks are made by a subcontractor and must be shipped to another site before machining. For R.R.56 the solution treatment is to quench from 530 °C and ageing is carried out at 175 °C. For R.R.50, the solution treatment may be omitted and the metal taken directly to precipitation hardening (155 °C-170 °C).

After solution treatment, the tensile strength of the alloy increases, but its Young's modulus decreases. The second stage of artificial aging increases the strength slightly, but also restores or improves the modulus.

R.R.53 B, chill cast
	Maximum Stress Tons/sq in.	Strain (elongation)
As cast	14	3%
Solution treated	22	6%
Solution treated and artificially aged	26	3%

Composition, R.R.53 B
Aluminium	92.8%
Copper	2.5%
Nickel	1.5%
Iron	1.2%
Silicon	1.2%
Magnesium	0.8%

== Alloy range ==
A range of R.R. alloys were produced.

By 1932 there were six in the R.R. 50-59 range. These could be worked by casting or forging, but they were not intended for rolling as sheet or general machining from bar stock.

R.R. 50	General-purpose sand casting alloy
R.R. 53	Die-cast piston alloy	Additional silicon content, to improve flow when machine casting
R.R. 56	General-purpose forging alloy
R.R. 58	Low-creep forging alloy for rotating impellers and compressors
R.R. 59	Forged piston alloy

At the Paris Airshow of 1953, High Duty Alloys displayed eight Hiduminium R.R. alloys: 20, 50, 56, 58, 66, 77, 80, 90. Also shown were gas turbine compressor and turbine blades in Hiduminium, and a range of their products in the Magnuminium alloy series.

R.R.58, also known as Aluminium 2618, comprising 2.5 copper, 1.5 magnesium, 1.0 iron, 1.2 nickel, 0.2 silicon, 0.1 titanium and the remainder aluminium, and originally intended for jet engine compressor blades, was used as the main structural material for the Concorde airframe in the 1960s and 1970s, supplied by High Duty Alloys, it was also known as AU2GN to the French side of the project.

Later alloys, such as R.R.66, were used for sheet, where high strength was needed in an alloy capable of being worked by deep drawing. This became increasingly important with the faster jet aircraft post-war, as issues such as transonic compressibility became important. It was now necessary for an aircraft's covering material to be strong, not merely the spar or framing beneath.

R.R.350, a sand-castable high temperature alloy, was used in the General Electric YJ93 jet engine and was also used in the General Electric GE4 intended for the later cancelled American Boeing 2707 SST project.
