= Strukturbericht designation =

System of detailed crystal structure classification

In crystallography, a Strukturbericht designation or Strukturbericht type is a system of detailed crystal structure classification by analogy to another known structure. The designations were intended to be comprehensive but are mainly used as supplement to space group crystal structures designations, especially historically. Each Strukturbericht designation is described by a single space group, but the designation includes additional information about the positions of the individual atoms, rather than just the symmetry of the crystal structure. While Strukturbericht symbols exist for many of the earliest observed and most common crystal structures, the system is not comprehensive, and is no longer being updated. Modern databases such as Inorganic Crystal Structure Database index thousands of structure types directly by the prototype compound (i.e. "the NaCl structure" instead of "the B1 structure"). These are essentially equivalent to the old Stukturbericht designations.

== History ==
The designations were established by the journal Zeitschrift für Kristallographie – Crystalline Materials, which published its first round of supplemental reviews under the name Strukturbericht from 1913-1928. These reports were collected into a book published in 1931 by Paul Peter Ewald and Carl Hermann which became Volume 1 of Strukturbericht. While the series was continued after the war under the name Structure reports, which was published through 1990, the series stopped generating new symbols. Instead, some new additional designations were given in books by Smithels, and Pearson.

For the first volume, the designation consisted of a capital letter (A,B,C,D,E,F,G,H,L,M,O) specifying a broad category of compounds, and then a number to specify a particular crystal structure. In the second volume, subscript numbers were added, some early symbols were modified (e.g., what was initially D1 became D0_{1}, noted in the tables below as "D1 → D0_{1}"), and the categories were modified (types I,K,S were added). In the third volume, the class I was renamed J. Later designations began to use a lower case letter in subscripts as well.

== A-compounds ==
The 'A' compounds are reserved for structures made up of atoms of all the same chemical element.

A compounds
Strukturbericht designation	Diagram	Prototype	Space group	Description
A1		Cu	Fm3̅m	Cubic close-packed structure (also: Face-centered cubic structure)
A2		W	Im3̅m	Body-centered cubic structure
A3		Mg	P6_{3}/mmc	Hexagonal close-packed structure
A3'		α-La	P6_{3}/mmc	α-La structure (ABAC Barlow packing)
A4		C (diamond)	Fd3̅m	Diamond cubic structure
A5		β-Sn	I4_{1}/amd	
A6		Indium	I4/mmm	Indium structure
A7		α-As	R3̅m	
A8		gray Se	P3_{1}21	Also called γ-Se, but that term is also used for a monoclinic form.
A9		C (graphite)	P6_{3}/mmc	Hexagonal graphite structure
A10		α-Hg	R3̅m	
A11		α-Ga	Cmca	α-Gallium structure
A12		α-Mn	I4̅3m	α-Manganese structure
A13		β-Mn	P4_{1}32	β-Manganese structure
A14		I_{2}	Cmca	Molecular iodine structure
A15		β-W	Pm3̅n	Weaire–Phelan structure
A16		α-S	Fddd	
A17		P	Cmca	Black phosphorus structure
A18		Cl	P4_{2}/ncm	Incorrect structure
A19 → A_{i}, A_{h}		Po (incorrectly)	C2	
A20		α-U	Cmcm	
A_{a}		α-Pa	I4/mmm	
A_{b}		β-U	P4_{2}/mnm	σ phase
A_{c}		α-Np	Pnma	
A_{d}		β-Np	P4/nmm	
A_{f}		γ-HgSn_{6-10}	P6/mmm	
A_{g}		B	P4_{2}/nnm	
A_{h}		α-Po	Pm3̅m	Simple cubic structure
A_{i}		β-Po	R3̅m	
A_{k}		γ-monoclinic Se	P2_{1}/c	
A_{l}		β-monoclinic Se	P2_{1}/c	

== B-compounds ==
'B' designates compounds of two elements with equal numbers of atoms.

B compounds
Strukturbericht designation	Diagram	Prototype	Space group	Description
B1		NaCl	Fm3̅m	Rock salt structure
B2		CsCl	Pm3̅m	caesium chloride structure
B3		ZnS	F4̅3m	Zincblende structure
B4		ZnS	P6_{3}mc	Wurtzite crystal structure
B5		4H SiC	P6_{3}mc	Moissanite (4H polytype) structure
B6		6H SiC	P6_{3}mc	Moissanite(6H polytype) structure
B7		Si-C 15R	R3m	15R-SiC structure
B8 → B8_{1}				
B8_{1}		NiAs	P6_{3}/mmc	Nickeline structure
B8_{2}		Ni_{2}In	P6_{3}/mmc	
B9		α-HgS	P3_{2}21	Cinnabar structure
B10		PbO	P4/nmm	Lead(II) oxide/Litharge structure
B11		γ-CuTi	P4/nmm	
B12 → B_{k}		BN (incorrectly)	P6_{3}mc	Originally reported boron nitride structure
B13		β-NiS	R3m	β-Nickel sulfide/Millerite structure
B14		FeAs	Pnma	Westerveldite structure
B15 → B27				
B16		GeS	Pnma	Germanium(II) sulfide/Herzenbergite structure
B17		PtS	P4_{2}/mmc	Platinum(II) sulfide/Cooperite structure
B18		CuS	P6_{3}/mmc	Copper monosulfide/Covellite structure
B19		β′-AuCd	Pmma	The martensitic β′-AuCd structure
B20		FeSi	P2_{1}3	FeSi/Fersilicite structure
B21		α-CO	P2_{1}3	α-Carbon monoxide structure
B24		TlF-II (incorrectly)	Fmmm	Originally reported Thallium(I) fluoride structure
B26		CuO	C2/c	Copper(II) oxide/Tenorite structure
B27		FeB	Pnma	Iron boride structure
B28 → B20				
B29 → B16		SnS (incorrectly)	Pnma	Tin(II) sulfide structure
B30		MgZn	Imm2	
B31 → B14		MnP	Pnma	
B32		NaTl	Fd3̅m	NaTl Zintl phase
B33		CrB	Cmcm	Chromium(III) boride structure
B34		PdS	P4_{2}/m	Palladium(II) sulfide structure
B35		CoSn	P6/mmm	
B37		SeTl	I4/mcm	
B_{a}		CoU	I2_{1}3	
B_{b}		ζ-AgZn	P3̅	
B_{c} → B33		CaSi	Cmcm	
B_{d}		η-NiSi		
B_{e}		CdSb	Pbca	
B_{f} → B33		CrB		(duplicate of B33)
B_{g}		MoB	I4_{1}/amd	Molybdenum boride structure
B_{h}		WC	P6̅m2	Tungsten carbide structure
B_{i}		AsTi	P6_{3}/mmc	
B_{k}		BN	P6_{3}/mmc	Boron nitride structure
B_{l}		AsS		
B_{m}		TiB		

== C-compounds ==
'C' designates compounds of the stoichiometry AB_{2}.

C compounds
Strukturbericht designation	Diagram	Prototype	Space group	Description
C1		CaF_{2}	Fm3̅m	Fluorite structure
C1_{b}		AgAsMg	F4̅3m	Half Heusler structure
C2		FeS_{2}	Pa3̅	Pyrite structure
C3		Cu_{2}O	Pn3̅m	Cuprite structure
C4		TiO_{2}	P4_{2}/mnm	Rutile structure
C5		TiO_{2}	I4_{1}/amd	Anatase structure
C6		CdI_{2}	P3̅m1	Cadmium iodide structure
C7		MoS_{2}	P6_{3}/mmc	Molybdenum disulfide structure
C8		β-SiO_{2}	P6_{2}22	β-Quartz structure
C9		β-Cristobalite	Fd3̅m	Idealized β-Cristobalite structure
C10		β-Tridymite	P6_{3}/mmc	β-Tridymite structure
C11 → C11_{a},C11_{b}				
C11_{a}		CaC_{2}	I4/mmm	
C11_{b}		MoSi_{2}	I4/mmm	Molybdenum disilicide structure
C12		CaSi_{2}	R3̅m	
C13		HgI_{2}	P4_{2}/nmc	Coccinite structure
C14		MgZn_{2}	P6_{3}/mmc	MgZn_{2} Laves phase
C15		MgCu_{2}	Fd3̅m	MgCu_{2} Laves phase
C15_{b}		AuBe_{5}	F4̅3m	
C16		CuAl_{2}	I4/mcm	Khatyrkite structure
C18		FeS_{2}	Pnnm	Marcasite structure
C19		α-Sm	R3̅m	α-Samarium structure (ABCBCACAB Barlow packing)
C21		TiO_{2}	Pbca	Brookite structure
C22		Fe_{2}P	P321 (original, incorrect structure); P6̅2m (revised)	
C23		PbCl_{2}	Pnma	Cotunnite structure
C24		HgBr_{2}	Cmc2_{1}	Mercury(II) bromide structure
C25 → C28		HgCl_{2}	Pnma	Mercury(II) chloride structure
C27		CdI_{2}	P6_{3}mc	
C28		HgCl_{2}		
C29 → C23		SrH_{2}	Pnma	Strontium hydride structure
C30		SiO_{2}	P4_{1}2_{1}2	α–Cristobalite structure
C32		AlB_{2}	P6/mmm	Aluminium diboride structure
C33		Bi_{2}Te_{3}	R3̅m	Bismuth telluride structure
C34		AuTe_{2}	C2/m	
C35		CaCl_{2}	Pnnm	Calcium chloride structure
C36		MgNi_{2}	P6_{3}/mmc	MgNi_{2} Laves phase
C37		Co_{2}Si	Pnma	
C38		Cu_{2}Sb	P4/nmm	
C39 → C15				
C40		CrSi_{2}	P6_{2}22	
C41 → C14				
C42		SiS_{2}	Ibam	Silicon disulfide structure
C43		ZrO_{2}	P2_{1}/c	Baddeleyite structure
C44		GeS_{2}	Fdd2	Germanium disulfide structure
C46		AuTe_{2}	Pma2	Krennerite structure
C47		SeO_{2}	P4_{2}/mbc	Selenium dioxide structure
C48 → C11_{b}				
C49		ZrSi_{2}	Cmcm	
C50		PdCl_{2}	Pnnm	α-Palladium(II) chloride structure
C51 → C16				
C53		Sr Br_{2}	P4/n	
C54		TiSi_{2}	Fddd	Titanium disilicide structure
C_{a}		Mg_{2}Ni	P6_{2}22	
C_{b}		CuMg_{2}	Fddd	
C_{c}		ThSi_{2}	I4_{1}/amd	
C_{e}		PdSn_{2}	Aba2	
C_{g}		ThC_{2}	C2/c	
C_{h}		Cu_{2}Te	P6/mmm	
C_{k}		LiZn_{2}		

== D-compounds ==
'D' designates compounds of arbitrary stoichiometry. Originally, D1-D10 were set aside for stoichiometry AB_{3}, D11-D20 for stoichiometry AB_{n} for n > 3, D31-D50 for (AB_{n})_{2}, and D51 up for the A_{m}B_{n} for arbitrary m and n.

D compounds
Strukturbericht designation	Diagram	Prototype	Space group	Description
D0_{2}		CoAs_{3}	Im3̅	Skutterudite structure
D0_{3}		BiF_{3}	Fm3̅m	Bismuth trifluoride structure
D0_{4}		CrCl_{3}	P3_{1}12	Chromium(III) chloride structure
D0_{5}		BiI_{3}	R3̅	Bismuth(III) iodide structure
D0_{6}		LaF_{3}	P3̅c1	Lanthanum trifluoride/Fluocerite structure
D0_{9}		α-ReO_{3}	Pm3̅m	α-Rhenium trioxide structure
D0_{11}		Fe_{3}C	Pnma	Cementite structure
D0_{12}		FeF_{3}	R3̅c	
D0_{14} → D0_{12}		AlF_{3}	R32	Aluminium fluoride structure
D0_{15}		AlCl_{3}	C2/m	Aluminium chloride structure
D0_{17}		BaS_{3}	P4̅2_{1}m	
D0_{18}		Na_{3}As	P6_{3}/mmc	Sodium arsenide structure
D0_{19}		Ni_{3}Sn	P6_{3}/mmc	
D0_{20}		Al_{3}Ni	Pnma	
D0_{21}		Cu_{3}P	P3̅c1 (original structure); P6_{3}cm (revised)	Copper(I) phosphide structure
D0_{22}		Al_{3}Ti	I4/mmm	
D0_{23}		Al_{3}Zr	I4/mmm	
D0_{24}		Ni_{3}Ti	P6_{3}/mmc	
D0_{a}		β-TiCu_{3}	Pmmn	
D0_{c} → D0'_{c}		SiU_{3}	I4/mcm	
D0'_{c}		Ir_{3}Si	I4/mcm	
D0_{d}		AsMn_{3}	Cmcm	
D0_{e}		Ni_{3}P	I4̅	
D1		NH_{3}	P2_{1}3	
D1_{2}		SiF_{4}	I4̅3m	Silicon tetrafluoride structure
D1_{3}		Al_{4}Ba	I4/mmm	
D1_{a}		Ni_{4}Mo	I4/m	
D1_{b}		Al_{4}U	Imma	
D1_{c}		PtSn_{4}	Aba2	
D1_{d}		Pb_{4}Pt	P4/nbm	
D1_{e}		B_{4}Th	P4/mbm	B_{4}Th structure
D1_{f} → C_{b}		Mn_{4}B		
D1_{g}		B_{4}C		
D2 → D0_{2}				
D2_{1}		CaB_{6}	Pm3̅m	Calcium hexaboride structure
D2_{3}		NaZn_{13}	Fm3̅c	
D2_{b}		Mn_{12}Th	I4/mmm	
D2_{c}		MnU_{6}	I4/mcm	
D2_{d}		CaCu_{5}	P6/mmm	
D2_{e}		BaHg_{11}	Pm3̅	
D2_{f}		UB_{12}	Fm3̅m	
D2_{g}		Fe_{8}N	I4/mmmm	
D2_{h}		Al_{6}Mn	Cmcm	
D3_{1}		Hg_{2}Cl_{2}	I4/mmm	Calomel structure
D5_{1}		Al_{2}O_{3}	R3̅c	Corrundum structure
D5_{2}		La_{2}O_{3}	P3̅m1	
D5_{3}		Mn_{2}O_{3}	Ia3̅	Manganese(III) oxide/Bixbyite structure
D5_{4}		Sb_{2}O_{3}	Fd3̅m	
D5_{5}		Ag_{2}O_{3}	Pn3̅m	
D5_{8}		Sb_{2}S_{3}	Pnma	Antimony trisulfide/Stibnite structure
D5_{9}		Zn_{3}Pt_{2}	P4_{2}/nmc	
D5_{10}		Cr_{3}C_{2}	Pnma	
D5_{11}		Sb_{2}O_{3}	Pccn	Antimony trioxide/Valentinite structure
D5_{12}		β–Bi_{2}O_{3}		
D5_{13}		Al_{3}Ni_{2}	P3̅m1	
D5_{a}		Si_{2}U_{3}	P4/mbm	
D5_{b}		Pt_{2}Sn_{3}	P6_{3}/mmc	
D5_{c}		Pu_{2}C_{3}	I4̅3d	
D5_{e}		Ni_{3}S_{2}	R32	Nickel subsulfide/Heazlewoodite structure
D5_{f}		As_{2}S_{3}	P2_{1}/n	Arsenic trisulfide structure
D7_{1}		Al_{4}C_{3}	R3̅m	Aluminium carbide structure
D7_{2}		Co_{3}S_{4}	Fd3̅m	
D7_{3}		Th_{3}P_{4}	I4̅3d	Th_{3}P_{4} structure
D7_{a}		𝛿-Ni_{3}Sn_{4}		
D7_{b}		Ta_{3}B_{4}	Immm	
D8_{1}		Fe_{3}Zn_{10}	I4̅3m	
D8_{2}		Cu_{5}Zn_{8}	I4̅3m	Gamma brass structure
D8_{3}		Cu_{9}Al_{4}	P4̅3m	
D8_{4}		Cr_{23}C_{6}	Fm3̅m	Cr_{23}C_{6} crystal structure/Chromium(II) carbide structure
D8_{5}		Fe_{7}W_{6}	R3̅m	
D8_{6}		Cu_{15}Si_{4}	I4̅3d	
D8_{8}		Mn_{5}Si_{3}	P6_{3}/mcm	
D8_{9}		Co_{9}S_{8}	Fm3̅m	
D8_{10}		Cr_{5}Al_{8}	R3m	
D8_{11}		Co_{2}Al_{5}	P6_{3}/mmc	
D8_{a}		Mn_{23}Th_{6},Cu_{16}Mg_{6}Si_{7} (G-phase)	Fm3̅m	
D8_{b}		σ-CrFe	P4_{2}/mnm	
D8_{c}		Mg_{2}Zn_{11}	Pm3̅	
D8_{d}		Co_{2}Al_{9}	P2_{1}/c	
D8_{e}		Mg_{32}(Al,Zn)_{49}	Im3̅	
D8_{f}		Ge_{7}Ir_{3}	Im3̅m	
D8_{g}		Ga_{2}Mg_{5}	Ibam	
D8_{h}		W_{2}B_{5}	P6_{3}/mmc	
D8_{i}		Mo_{2}B_{5}	R3̅m	
D8_{k}		Th_{7}S_{12}	P6_{3}/m	
D8_{l}		Cr_{5}B_{4}	I4/mcm	
D8_{m}		W_{5}Si_{3}	I4/mcm	
D10_{1}		C_{3}Cr_{7}	Pnma	
D10_{2}		Fe_{3}Th_{7}	P6_{3}mc	
D31 → D3_{1}				
D51 → D5_{1}				
D52 → D5_{2}				
D61 → D6_{1}				
D81 → D8_{1}				
D82 → D8_{2}				
D83 → D8_{3}				

== E to K compounds ==
Letters between 'E' and 'K' designate more complex compounds.

E through K compounds
Strukturbericht designation	Diagram	Prototype	Space group	Description
E0_{1}		PbFCl	P4/nmm	Matlockite structure
E0_{3}		CdOHCl	P6_{3}mc	
E0_{5}		FeOCl		Iron oxychloride structure
E0_{7}		FeAsS	P2_{1}/c	Arsenopyrite structure
E1_{1}		CuFeS_{2}	I4̅2d	Chalcopyrite structure
E1_{a}		MgCuAl_{2}	Cmcm	
E1_{b}		AgAuTe_{4}	P2/c	Sylvanite structure
E2_{1}		CaTiO_{3}	Pm3̅m	Perovskite structure
E2_{2}		FeTiO_{3}	R3̅	Ilmenite structure
E2_{4}		NH_{4}CdC_{13}	Pnma	
E3		CdAl_{2}S_{4}	I4̅	
E3_{3}		FeSb_{2}S_{4}	Pnam	Berthierite structure
E8_{1}		Eu_{2}Ir_{2}O_{7}	Fd3̅m	Pyrochlore structure
E9_{1}		Ca_{3}Al_{2}O_{6}	Pm3̅m	
E9_{3}		Fe_{3}W_{3}C	Fd3̅m	
E9_{4}		Al_{5}C_{3}N	P6_{3}mc	
E9_{a}		Al_{7}Cu_{2}Fe	P4/mnc	
E9_{b}		Al_{8}FeMg_{3}Si_{6}	P6̅2m	
E9_{c}		Mn_{3}Al_{9}Si	P6_{3}/mmc	
E9_{d}		AlLi_{3}N_{2}	Ia3̅	
E9_{e}		CuFe_{2}S_{3}	Pnma	Cubanite structure
F0_{1}		NiSSb	P2_{1}3	Ullmannite structure
F0_{2}		COS	R3m	Carbonyl sulfide structure
F5_{1}		CrNaS_{2}	R3̅m	
F5_{2}		KN_{3}	I4/mcm	
F5_{4}		NH_{4}O_{2}Cl	P4̅2_{1}m	
F5_{6}		CuSbS_{2}	Pnma	Chalcostibite structure
F5_{9}		KCNS	Pbcm	
F5_{10}		KAg(CN)_{2}	P3̅1c	
F5_{13}		KBO_{2}	R3̅c	
F5_{a}		FeKS_{2}	C2/c	
F51 → F5_{1}				
F52 → F5_{2}				
F61 → E1_{1}				
G0_{1}		CaCO_{3}	R3̅c	Calcite structure
G0_{2}		CaCO_{3}	Pmcn	Aragonite structure
G0_{6}		KClO_{3}	P2_{1}/m	
G3		NaClO_{3}	P2_{1}3	Sodium chlorate structure
G3_{2}		Na_{2}SO_{3}	P3̅	Sodium sulfite structure
G4 → E2_{2}				
G5 → E2_{1}				
G7_{1}		CeCO_{3}F	P6̅2c	Bastnäsite structure
H0_{1}		CaSO_{4}	Cmcm	Anhydrite structure
H0_{2}		BaSO_{4}	Pnma	Baryte structure
H0_{3} → S1_{1}				
H0_{5}		KClO_{4}	Pnma	Potassium perchlorate structure
H0_{7}		BPO_{4}	I4̅	
H1 → H0_{1}				
H1_{1}		Al_{2}MgO_{4}	Fd3̅m	Spinel structure
H1_{2} → S1_{2}				
H1_{3} → S1_{3}				
H1_{5}		K_{2}PtC_{14}	P4/mmmm	
H1_{6}		β-K_{2}SO_{4}	Pnma	
H2 → H0_{2}				
H2_{1}		Ag_{3}PO_{4}	P4̅3n	Silver phosphate structure
H2_{4}		Cu_{3}S_{4}V	P4̅3m	
H2_{5}		AsCu_{3}S_{4}	Pmn2_{1}	Enargite structure
H2_{6}		Cu_{2}FeS_{4}Sn	I4̅2m	Stannite structure
H3 → S1_{1}				
H3_{1} → S1_{4}				
H4		CaWO_{4}	I4_{1}/a	Scheelite structure
H5_{7}		Ca_{5}(PO_{4})_{3}F,Cl,OH	P6_{3}/m	Apatite structure
H11 → H1_{1}				
H12 → S1_{2}				
H13 → S1_{3}				
H15 → H1_{5}				
H31 → S1_{4}				
H61 → J1_{1}				
I1_{1} → J1_{1}				
I1_{13} → J1_{13}				
J1_{1}		K_{2}PtCl_{6}	Fm3̅m	
J1_{13}		K_{2}GeF_{6}	P3̅m1	
K0_{1}		K_{2}S_{2}O_{5}	P2_{1}/m	
K1_{1}		KSO_{3}	P321	
K1_{2}		CsSO_{3}	P6_{3}mc	
K3_{1}		Cs_{3}CoC_{15}	I4/mcm	
K4_{1}		NH_{4}SO_{4}	P2_{1}/c	

== L-compounds ==
'L' designates intermetallic compounds.

L compounds
Strukturbericht designation	Diagram	Prototype	Space group	Description
L1_{0}		CuAu	P4/mmm	
L1_{1}		CuPt	R3̅m	
L1_{2}		Cu_{3}Au	Pm3̅m	Cu_{3}Au structure
L1_{3}		CdPt_{3}	Cmmm	
L1_{a}		CuPt_{3}		
L2_{1}		AlCu_{2}Mn	Fm3̅m	Heusler compounds
L2_{2}		Sb_{2}Tl_{7}	Im3̅m	
L2_{a}		𝛿-CuTi	P4/mmm	
L6_{0}		CuTi_{3}	P4/mmm	
L'1		Fe_{4}N	Pm3̅m	
L'1_{2}		AlF_{3}C		Perovskite structure
L'2		ThH_{2}	I4/mmm	
L'2_{b}		ThH_{2}	I4/mmm	
L'3 → B8_{1}		Fe_{2}N		
L'3_{2}		β-V_{2}N	P3̅1m	
L6_{0}		Ti_{3}Cu	P4/mmm	
L10 → L1_{0}				
L'10 → L'1				
L11 → L1_{1}				
L12 → L1_{2}				
L13 → L1_{3}				
L20 → B2				
L'20 → L'2				
L21 → L2_{1}				
L22 → L2_{2}				

== S-compounds ==
S compounds
Strukturbericht designation	Diagram	Prototype	Space group	Description
S1_{1}		ZrSiO_{4}	I4_{1}/amd	Zircon structure
S1_{2}		Mg_{2}SiO_{4}	Pnma	Forsterite structure
S1_{3}		Be_{2}SiO_{4}	R3̅	Phenakite structure
S1_{4}		Al_{2}Ca_{3}Si_{3}O_{12}	Ia3̅d	Garnet structure
S2_{1}		Sc_{2}Si_{2}O_{7}	C2/m	Thortveitite structure
S3_{1}		Be_{3}Al_{2}Si_{6}O_{18}	P6/mcc	Beryl structure
S3_{2}		BaSi_{4}O_{9}	P6̅c2	
S5_{3}		Ca_{2}MgSi_{2}O_{7}	P4̅2_{1}m	Åkermanite structure
S6		NaAlSi_{2}O_{6}H_{2}O	I4̅3d	
S6_{2}		Na_{8}Al_{6}Si_{6}O_{24}C_{l2}	P4̅3n	

== See also ==
- Space group
- Crystal system
- Pearson symbol
