= Complex metallic alloy =

Class of chemical compounds

Complex metallic alloys (CMAs) or complex intermetallics (CIMs) are intermetallic compounds characterized by the following structural features:

1. large unit cells, comprising some tens up to thousands of atoms,
2. the presence of well-defined atom clusters, frequently of icosahedral point group symmetry,
3. the occurrence of inherent disorder in the ideal structure.

== Overview ==
Complex metallic alloys is an umbrella term for intermetallic compounds with a relatively large unit cell. There is no precise definition of how large the unit cell of a complex metallic alloy has to be, but the broadest definition includes Zintl phases, skutterudites, and Heusler compounds on the most simple end, and quasicrystals on the more complex end.

== Research ==
Following the invention of X-ray crystallography techniques in the 1910s, the atomic structure of many compounds was investigated. Most metals have relatively simple structures. However, in 1923 Linus Pauling reported on the structure of the intermetallic NaCd_{2}, which had such a complicated structure he was unable to fully explain it. Thirty years later, he got as far as finding that NaCd_{2} contained about 384 sodium and 768 cadmium atoms in each unit cell.

Most physical properties of CMAs show distinct differences with respect to the behavior of normal metallic alloys and therefore these materials possess a high potential for technological application.

The European Commission funded the Network of Excellence CMA from 2005 to 2010, uniting 19 core groups in 12 countries. From this emerged the European Integrated Center for the Development of New Metallic Alloys and Compounds (previously C-MAC, now ECMetAC), which connects researchers at 21 universities.

== Examples ==
Example phases are:

- β-Mg_{2}Al_{3}: 1168 atoms per unit cell, face-centred cubic, atoms arranged in Friauf polyhedra.
- ξ'–Al_{74}Pd_{22}Mn_{4}: 318 atoms per unit cell, face-centred orthorhombic, atoms arranged in Mackay-type clusters.
- Mg_{32}(Al,Zn)_{49} (Bergman phase): 163 atoms per unit cell, body centred cubic, atoms arranged in Bergman clusters.
- Al_{3}Mn (Taylor phase): 204 atoms per unit cell, face-centred orthorhombic, atoms arranged in Mackay-type clusters.

== See also ==
- High-entropy alloys, alloys of multiple elements which ideally form no intermetallics
- Holmium–magnesium–zinc quasicrystal
- Frank–Kasper phases
- Laves phase
- Hume-Rothery rules
