= Frank-Kasper phases (soft matter) =

Ordered mesophases in soft materials mimicking complex alloy structures

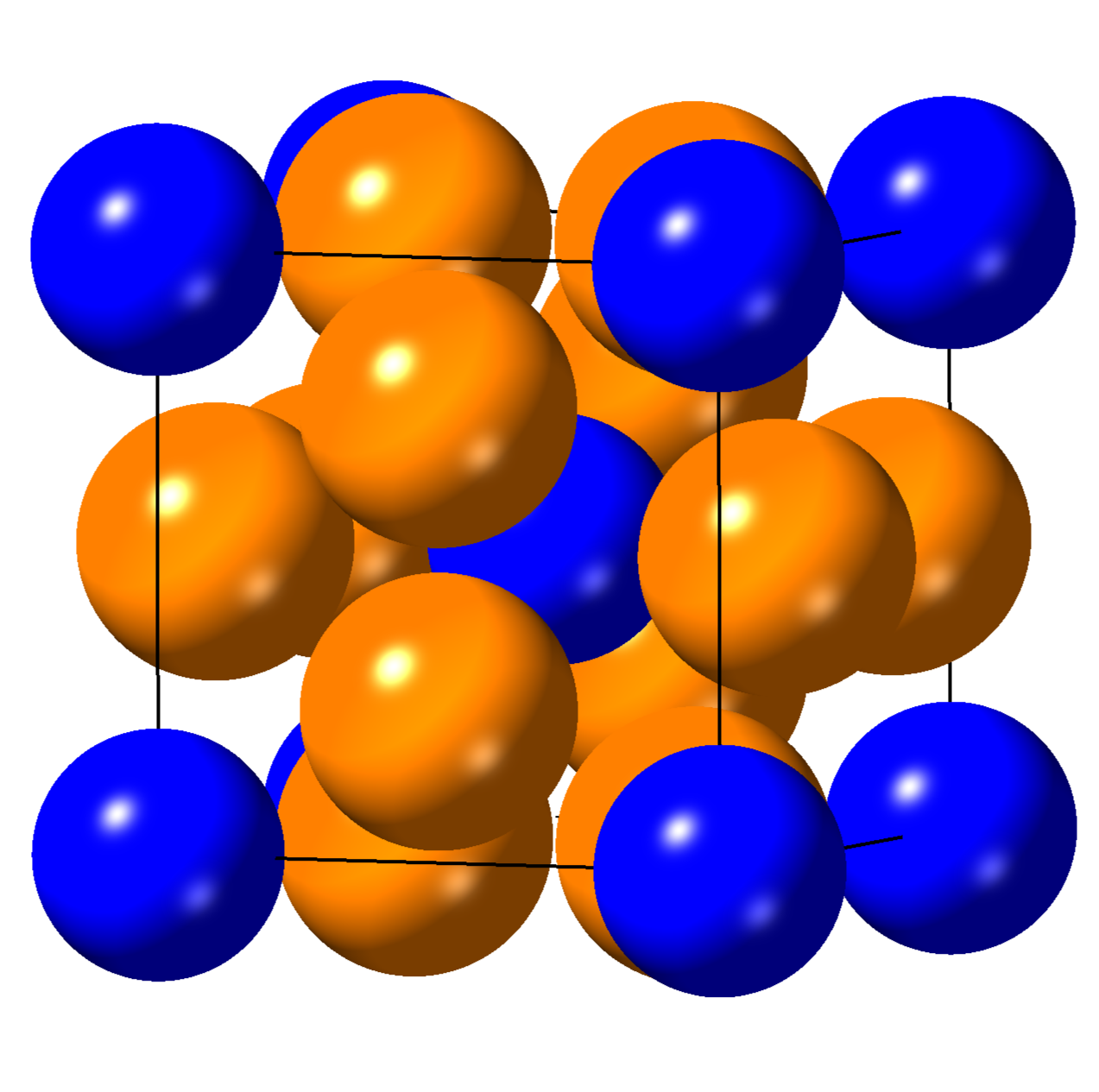
Space-filling model of the A15 phase unit cell. The structure consists of smaller domains at Z12 coordination sites (blue) and larger domains at Z14 sites (orange).

Frank–Kasper phases (soft matter) are a class of ordered mesophases that adopt the tetrahedrally close-packed (TCP) symmetries originally discovered in intermetallic alloys. These structures have been observed in a variety of self-assembling soft matter systems, including liquid crystals, dendrimers, surfactants, and block copolymers. While identical in crystallographic symmetry to their metallic counterparts—such as the A15 and sigma (σ) phases—soft matter Frank–Kasper phases occur on a mesoscopic length scale (typically 10–100 nanometers), several orders of magnitude larger than atomic lattices.

Unlike the rigid atomic spheres in metals, the constituent particles in soft matter (e.g., micelles or supramolecular spheres) are deformable. The formation of these phases is driven by a balance between interfacial tension and entropic chain stretching, often described as a response to packing frustration. When spherical domains cannot fill space efficiently as a body-centered cubic (BCC) or face-centered cubic (FCC) lattice without excessive deformation, the system may adopt complex Frank–Kasper geometries containing multiple non-equivalent sites with coordination numbers Z12, Z14, Z15, or Z16.

== History ==
The topological principles of these structures were first established in 1958 by Charles Frank and John S. Kasper, who categorized a family of complex alloy structures based on the packing of asymmetric icosahedra. For decades, these phases were thought to be unique to "hard" condensed matter, such as transition metal alloys.

In the late 1990s and early 2000s, analogous symmetries began to be identified in soft condensed matter systems. The first observations were made in supramolecular assemblies, specifically within thermotropic liquid crystals and dendrimers. Researchers identified columnar and spherical phases exhibiting A15 and σ symmetries, establishing that TCP structures could form via self-assembly mechanisms distinct from metallic bonding.

A significant expansion of the field occurred in 2010, when the σ phase was reported in a conformational asymmetric diblock copolymer melt by Lee, Bluemle, and Bates. This discovery demonstrated that these complex lattices could form spontaneously in simple polymeric fluids solely through thermodynamic self-assembly. Subsequent research identified additional phases, including the A15 and C14/C15 Laves phases, in various block copolymer architectures. Theoretical treatments using self-consistent field theory (SCFT) have since provided a framework for understanding the stability of these phases, attributing their formation to the polydispersity of domain sizes and the minimization of free energy associated with filling space with deformable spheres.

In 2024, Liu et al. reported the self-assembly of five-fold symmetric molecular pentagons into the μ phase and a newly discovered ϕ phase, marking the first identification of a Frank–Kasper phase in soft matter that lacks a known metallic prototype.

== Structural characteristics ==
Frank–Kasper phases in soft matter share the same crystallographic symmetry groups as their intermetallic counterparts but differ fundamentally in the physical nature of their constituent building blocks. While metallic phases consist of individual atoms, soft matter FK phases are composed of discrete, self-assembled domains—such as micelles, dendrimers, or nanocrystals—that behave as "soft spheres."

=== Coordination and geometry ===
The defining feature of these phases is tetrahedral close packing (TCP), where the constituent domains are arranged such that the interstitial voids form exclusive tetrahedra. This arrangement maximizes local packing efficiency but prevents the formation of a global structure with high symmetry (such as face-centered cubic) without introducing geometrical frustration.

To accommodate this packing, the domains occupy sites with distinct coordination numbers (Z). Unlike simple cubic lattices where all sites are equivalent, FK phases contain multiple classes of sites:

- Z12 sites: The smallest volume sites, where the domain is surrounded by 12 neighbors in an icosahedral arrangement.
- Z14, Z15, Z16 sites: Larger volume sites with 14, 15, or 16 neighbors, respectively.

In soft matter, these local environments are often analyzed using Voronoi tessellation, which partitions the space into polyhedral cells (Wigner–Seitz cells). For example, the A15 phase (space group $Pm\overline{3}n$) consists of two site types: two smaller spheres at Z12 positions (icosahedra) and six larger spheres at Z14 positions (Frank–Kasper polyhedra).

=== Deformability and mass exchange ===
A key distinction between metallic and soft matter FK phases is the deformability of the particles. In alloy systems, atoms are effectively hard spheres with fixed radii. In soft matter systems, particularly block copolymers, the domains are aggregates of flexible polymer chains. This leads to two unique characteristics:

1. Domain Deformability: The soft domains can deviate from perfect sphericity to fill the Wigner–Seitz polyhedra, minimizing void space.
2. Volume Selection: The domains can self-regulate their aggregation number (the number of polymer chains per micelle). This allows the system to spontaneously generate the specific distribution of domain volumes required for the FK lattice (e.g., creating a population of smaller and larger micelles to fit the Z12 and Z14 sites), a phenomenon not possible in atomic systems where atomic radii are fixed.

== Thermodynamics and formation mechanism ==
The formation of Frank–Kasper phases in soft matter is primarily governed by the minimization of free energy, driven by a competition between interfacial tension and entropic penalties associated with chain stretching. This mechanism is often analyzed within the framework of the Kelvin problem, which asks how to partition space into equal-volume cells with minimal surface area.

=== Packing frustration ===
In self-assembling systems like block copolymers, amphiphilic molecules separate into distinct domains (e.g., spheres in a matrix) to minimize contact between immiscible blocks. The ideal shape for minimizing interfacial area is a sphere. However, spheres cannot tile 3D space without leaving gaps. To fill space at constant density, the domains must deform into polyhedra (such as the truncated octahedron of the body-centered cubic, or BCC, lattice).

This deformation incurs an entropic penalty because polymer chains must stretch non-uniformly to fill the corners of the polyhedra. This energy penalty is termed packing frustration.

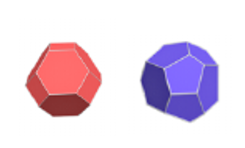
Comparison of Voronoi cells. The Frank–Kasper Z14 polyhedron (right) is topologically closer to a sphere than the BCC truncated polyhedron (left), allowing soft domains to fill space with less entropic stretching penalty.

- BCC vs. FK: The BCC lattice requires domains to deform significantly from spheres. Frank–Kasper phases offer an alternative: by adopting a lattice with multiple site types (Z12, Z14, etc.), the domains can form polyhedral shapes that are more spherical (closer to the ideal Kelvin cell) than the BCC Wigner–Seitz cell.
- The Trade-off: While FK phases reduce packing frustration (chains stretch less), they introduce a penalty due to lattice polydispersity. The system must maintain domains of different sizes, which is entropically unfavorable for monodisperse polymer chains.

=== Conformational asymmetry ===
Theoretical models, particularly self-consistent field theory (SCFT), indicate that FK phases are stabilized by conformational asymmetry ($\epsilon$). This parameter quantifies the difference in space-filling characteristics between the two blocks of a copolymer (often related to differences in statistical segment length or density). When the asymmetry is high, the penalty for chain stretching becomes significant. The system prefers to break symmetry, transitioning from a simple BCC lattice to complex A15 or σ phases.

== Types of soft-matter FK phases ==
While over 20 distinct Frank–Kasper phases have been identified in metallurgy, soft matter systems predominantly exhibit a subset of these structures, most notably the A15, σ, and Laves phases.

=== A15 phase ===
The A15 phase (space group $Pm\overline{3}n$) is the most frequently observed FK structure in soft matter, often appearing as an intermediate morphology between BCC spheres and cylindrical phases. The unit cell contains eight micellar domains. In block copolymers, the volume ratio between the domains at Z14 sites and Z12 sites is approximately 1.05–1.10.

=== Sigma (σ) phase ===
The σ phase (space group $P4_2/mnm$) is a complex tetragonal lattice containing 30 particles per unit cell. The lattice features five distinct crystallographic sites with coordination numbers ranging from Z12 to Z15. It is often found in a narrow thermodynamic window between the A15 phase and the hexagonal cylinder phase in systems with high conformational asymmetry.

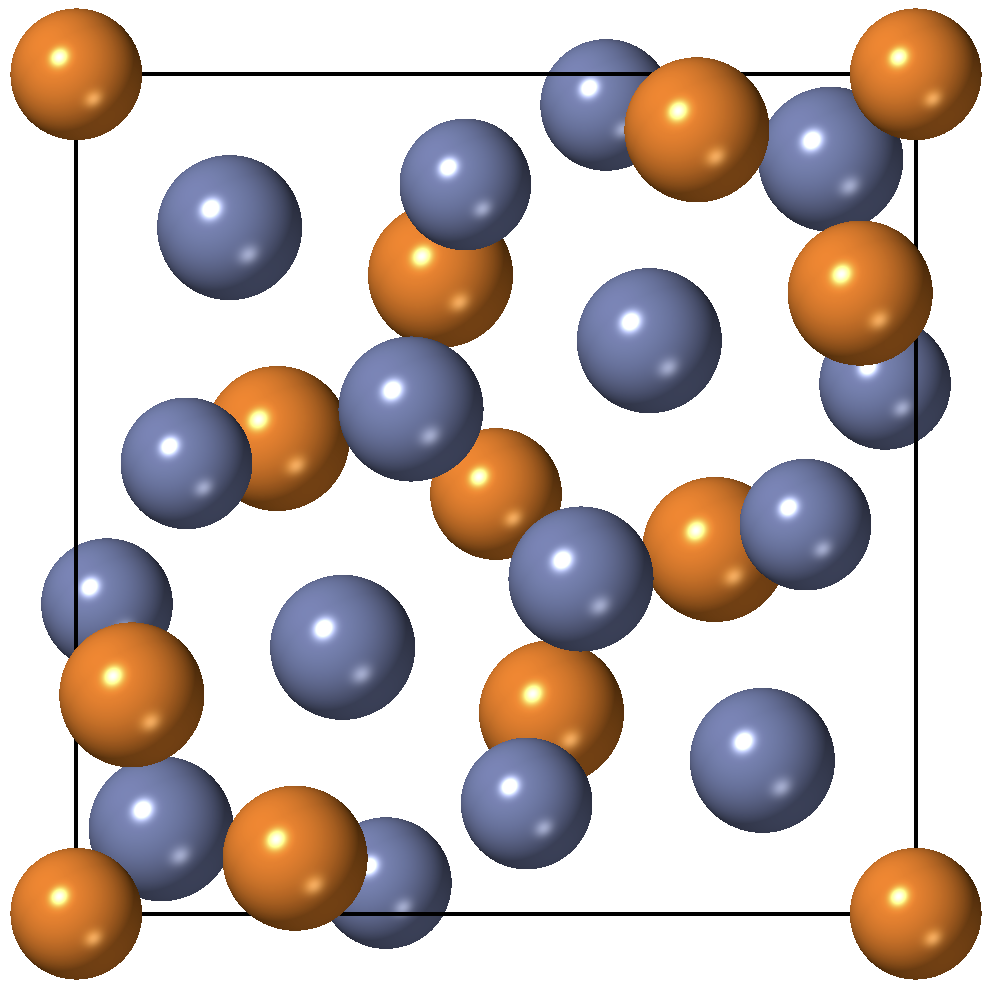
The unit cell of the sigma phase, projected along the $c$ axis

=== Laves phases ===
The Laves phases—specifically the hexagonal C14 (space group $P6_3/mmc$) and cubic C15 (space group $Fd\overline{3}m$)—are binary structures typically composed of two distinct particle sizes. In soft matter, these are most commonly observed in binary blends of small and large particles (e.g., nanoparticle superlattices or surfactant mixtures).

The stability of Laves phases is strongly dependent on the radius ratio ($\gamma = R_L/R_S$).

- Ideal Laves packing occurs at $\gamma \approx 1.225$.
- Unlike A15 or σ phases which can form in single-component systems via spontaneous mass redistribution, C14/C15 phases usually require explicit mixing of two distinct populations of micelles or particles to achieve the necessary stoichiometry (AB_{2}).

=== Dodecagonal quasicrystals ===
In addition to periodic crystals, soft matter systems can form aperiodic quasicrystalline arrays that follow Frank–Kasper packing rules. These structures, often displaying 12-fold rotational symmetry, have been observed in dendrimers and star-block copolymers.

== Experimental characterization ==
The identification of Frank–Kasper phases in soft matter relies on scattering techniques and direct imaging to resolve the complex symmetries and mesoscopic length scales inherent to these systems.

=== Small-angle X-ray scattering (SAXS) ===
Small-angle X-ray scattering is the primary method for identifying FK phases. Because soft matter FK unit cells are large, they produce rich diffraction patterns with many permissible reflections at low wavevectors ($q$). The A15 phase is identified by peaks at ratios of $\sqrt{2}, \sqrt{4}, \sqrt{5}, \sqrt{6}...$ relative to the primary peak, while the σ phase displays a complex sequence of peaks due to its large tetragonal unit cell.

=== Transmission electron microscopy (TEM) ===
Transmission Electron Microscopy (TEM) offers direct real-space visualization of the lattice. In block copolymers, samples are typically stained with heavy metals (e.g., osmium tetroxide) to provide contrast. TEM images reveal characteristic tiling patterns when viewed along specific crystallographic axes; for instance, the [001] projection of the σ phase reveals a distinct pattern of squares and triangles corresponding to the arrangement of the coordination skeletons.

== Applications ==
While the study of Frank–Kasper phases in soft matter is largely driven by fundamental interest in self-assembly and crystallography, their unique geometric properties offer potential utility in nanotechnology.

=== Nanolithography ===
Block copolymers are widely investigated for directed self-assembly (DSA) in semiconductor manufacturing. Frank–Kasper phases expand the library of available patterns, offering templates with lower symmetry and varying domain sizes. The distinct lattice sites can be used to organize functional nanoparticles into precise arrays, or to create mesoporous materials with complex, interconnected pore networks.

=== Photonics ===
The length scales of soft-matter Frank–Kasper phases (10–100 nm) are commensurate with the wavelengths of visible and ultraviolet light. The high sphericity of the Brillouin zones in complex TCP phases favors the formation of complete photonic bandgaps, which block the propagation of light in all directions. The quasi-isotropic nature of these lattices allows for more uniform refractive indices compared to simple cubic structures.

== See also ==
- Self-assembly
- Quasicrystal
