= Magnesium aluminide =

$\beta$-Mg_{2}Al_{3}
Names
- Other names: Samson phase; Mg_{448}Al_{720}

Identifiers
3D model (JSmol)	Mg_{2}Al_{3}: Interactive image; Mg_{17}Al_{12}: Interactive image
- InChI: Mg_{2}Al_{3}: InChI=1S/3Al.2Mg; Mg_{17}Al_{12}: InChI=1S/17Al.12Mg
- SMILES: Mg_{2}Al_{3}: [Mg].[Mg].[Al].[Al].[Al]; Mg_{17}Al_{12}: [Mg].[Mg].[Mg].[Mg].[Mg].[Mg].[Mg].[Mg].[Mg].[Mg].[Mg].[Mg].[Mg].[Mg].[Mg].[Mg].[Mg].[Al].[Al].[Al].[Al].[Al].[Al].[Al].[Al].[Al].[Al].[Al].[Al]

Properties
Density	2.235 g/cm^{3}, solid

Structure
Space group	Fd3̅m (No. 227)
Lattice constant	a = 2823.9 pm
- Except where otherwise noted, data are given for materials in their standard state (at 25 °C [77 °F], 100 kPa). Infobox references

Magnesium aluminide is an intermetallic compound of magnesium and aluminium. Common phases (molecular structures) include the beta phase (Mg_{2}Al_{3}) and the gamma phase (Mg_{17}Al_{12}), which both have cubic crystal structures. Magnesium aluminides are important constituents of 5XXX aluminium alloys (aluminium-magnesium) and magnesium-aluminium alloys, determining many of their engineering properties. Due to the advantage of low density and being strong, magnesium aluminide is important for aircraft engines. MgAl has also been investigated for use as a reactant to produce metal hydrides in hydrogen storage technology. Like many intermetallics, MgAl compounds often have unusual stoichiometries with large and complex unit cells.

$\beta$-Mg_{2}Al_{3} is a complex metallic alloy which crystallizes in cubic unit cell with 1168 atoms per cell. If the Wyckoff positions were fully occupied, the structure would have 1832 atoms, but the sites are only partially occupied. The structure has very low density, and has been suggested for use in hydrogen storage.
