= Nickel aluminide =

Chemical compound

Nickel aluminide refers to either of two widely used intermetallic compounds, Ni_{3}Al or NiAl, but the term is sometimes used to refer to any nickel–aluminium alloy. These alloys are widely used because of their high strength even at high temperature, low density, corrosion resistance, and ease of production. Ni_{3}Al is of specific interest as a precipitate in nickel-based superalloys, where it is called the γ' (gamma prime) phase. It gives these alloys high strength and creep resistance up to 0.7–0.8 of its melting temperature. Meanwhile, NiAl displays excellent properties such as lower density and higher melting temperature than those of Ni_{3}Al, and good thermal conductivity and oxidation resistance. These properties make it attractive for special high-temperature applications like coatings on blades in gas turbines and jet engines. However, both these alloys have the disadvantage of being quite brittle at room temperature, with Ni_{3}Al remaining brittle at high temperatures as well. To address this problem, has been shown that Ni_{3}Al can be made ductile when manufactured in single-crystal form rather than in polycrystalline form.

== Properties ==
Nickel aluminide intermetallic compounds
| | Ni_{3}Al | NiAl |
|---|---|---|
| Crystal structure (Strukturbericht designation) | L1_{2} | B2 |
| Lattice parameter a | 0.357 nm | 0.2887 nm |
| Density | 7.50 g/cm^{3} | 5.85 g/cm^{3} |
| Young's modulus | 179 GPa | 294 GPa |
| Yield strength | 855 MPa | |
| Melting point | 1,385 °C (1,658 K) | 1,639 °C (1,912 K) |
| Thermal expansion coefficient | 12.5×10^{−6}/K | 13.2×10^{−6}/K |
| Electrical resistivity | 32.59×10^{−8} Ω⋅m | 8 to 10×10^{−8} Ω⋅m |
| Thermal conductivity | 28.85 W/(m⋅K) | 76 W/(m⋅K) |

== Ni_{3}Al ==
An important disadvantage of polycrystalline Ni_{3}Al-based alloys are their room-temperature and high-temperature brittleness, which interferes with potential structural applications. This brittleness is generally attributed to the inability of dislocations to move in the highly ordered lattices. The introduction of small amount of boron can drastically increase the ductility by suppressing intergranular fracture.

Ni-based superalloys derive their strength from the formation of γ' precipitates (Ni_{3}Al) in the γ phase (Ni) which strengthen the alloys through precipitation hardening. In these alloys the volume fraction of the γ' precipitates is as high as 80%. Because of this high volume fraction, the evolution of these γ' precipitates during the alloys' life cycles is important: a major concern is the coarsening of these γ' precipitates at high temperature (800 to 1000 °C), which greatly reduces the alloys' strength. This coarsening is due to the balance between interfacial and elastic energy in the γ + γ' phase and is generally inevitable over long durations of time. This coarsening problem is addressed by introducing other elements such as Fe, Cr and Mo, which generate multiphase configurations that can significantly increase the creep resistance. This creep resistance is attributed to the formation of inhomogeneous precipitate Cr_{4.6}MoNi_{2.1}, which pins dislocations and prevents further coarsening of the γ' phase. The addition of Fe and Cr also drastically increases the weldability of the alloy.

== NiAl ==
Despite its beneficial properties, NiAl generally suffers from two factors: very high brittleness at low temperatures (<330 °C (626 °F)) and rapid loss of strength for temperatures higher than 550 °C (1,022 °F). The brittleness is attributed to both the high energy of anti-phase boundaries as well as high atomic order along grain boundaries. Similar to that of Ni_{3}Al-based alloys these issues are generally addressed via the integration of other elements. Attempted elements can be broken into three groups depending on their influence of microstructure:

- Elements that form ternary intermetallic phases such as Ti and Hf
- Pseudobinary eutectic forming elements such as Cr
- Elements with high solubility in NiAl such as Fe, Co and Cu

Some of the more successful elements have been shown to be Fe, Co and Cr which drastically increase room temperature ductility as well as hot workability. This increase is due to the formation of γ phase which modifies the β phase grains. Alloying with Fe, Ga and Mo has also been shown to drastically improve room temperature ductility as well. Most recently, refracturing metals such as Cr, W and Mo have been added and resulted in not only increases in room temperature ductility but also increases in strength and fracture toughness at high temperatures. This is due to the formation of unique microstructures such as the eutectic alloy Ni_{45.5}Al_{9}Mo and α-Cr inclusions that contribute to solid solution hardening. It is even being shown that these complex alloys (Ni_{42}Al_{51}Cr_{3}Mo_{4}) have the potential to be fabricated via additive manufacturing processes such as selective laser manufacturing, vastly increasing the potential applications for these alloys.

== Nickel-based superalloys ==
In nickel-based superalloys, regions of Ni_{3}Al (called γ' phase) precipitate out of the nickel-rich matrix (called γ phase) to give high strength and creep resistance. Many alloy formulations are available and they usually include other elements, such as chromium, molybdenum, and iron, in order to improve various properties.

=== Examples ===
==== IC-221M ====
An alloy of Ni_{3}Al, known as IC-221M, is made up of nickel aluminide combined with several other metals including chromium, molybdenum, zirconium and boron. Adding boron increases the ductility of the alloy by positively altering the grain boundary chemistry and promoting grain refinement. The Hall-Petch parameters for this material were σ_{o} = 163 MPa and k_{y} = 8.2 MPaˑcm^{1/2}. Boron increases the hardness of bulk Ni_{3}Al by a similar mechanism.

This alloy is extremely strong for its weight, five times stronger than common SAE 304 stainless steel. Unlike most alloys, IC-221M increases in strength from room temperature up to 800 °C (1,470 °F).

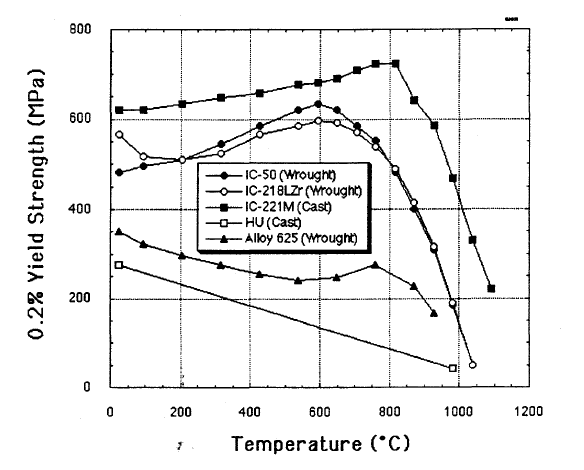
.

The alloy is very resistant to heat and corrosion, and finds use in heat-treating furnaces and other applications where its longer lifespan and reduced corrosion give it an advantage over stainless steel. It has been found that the microstructure of this alloy includes Ni_{5}Zr eutectic phase and therefore solution treatment is effective for hot working without cracking.
