= Tongbaite =

Type of rare mineral

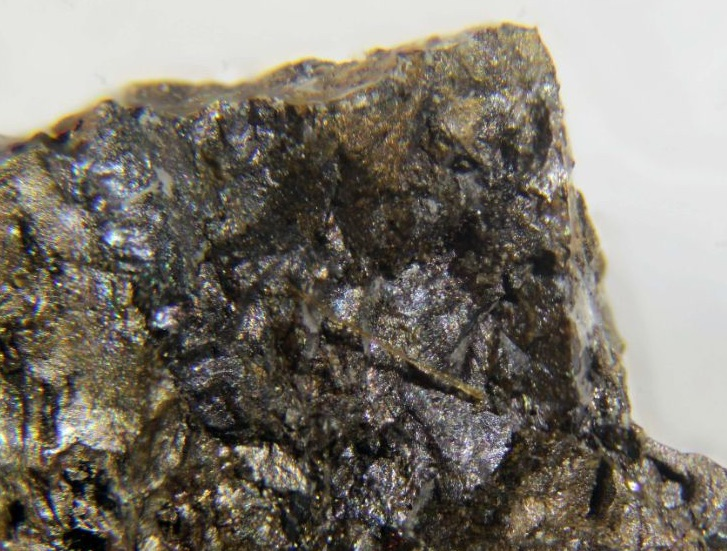

General
- Category: Carbide mineral
- Formula: Cr_{3}C_{2}
- IMA symbol: Tgb
- Strunz classification: 1.BA.15
- Crystal system: Orthorhombic
- Crystal class: Dipyramidal (mmm); H-M symbol: (2/m 2/m 2/m)
- Space group: Pnma
- Unit cell: a = 5.52 Å, b = 11.48 Å c = 2.82 Å; Z = 4

Identification
- Color: Pale brownish yellow; pale violet in reflected light
- Crystal habit: Prismatic crystals, pseudohexagonal
- Tenacity: Brittle
- Mohs scale hardness: 8.5
- Luster: Metallic
- Diaphaneity: Opaque
- Specific gravity: 6.64 calculated

Tongbaite is a rare mineral that has the chemical formula Cr_{3}C_{2}, or chromium carbide.

It was first described in 1983 for an occurrence in Liu village, Tongbai County (桐柏县), Henan Province, China and named for the locality. It occurs in an ultramafic rock deposit. It has also been found in the Tibet Autonomous Region and the Isovsky District, in the Urals of Russia.
