= Auricupride =

Natural alloy containing copper and gold

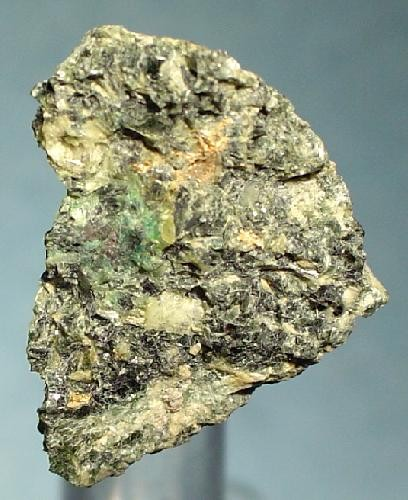
- Auricupride

General
- Category: Native elements
- Formula: Cu_{3}Au
- IMA symbol: Auc
- Strunz classification: 1.AA.10a
- Dana classification: 1.1.2.1
- Crystal system: Cubic
- Crystal class: Hexoctahedral (m3̅m); H-M symbol: (4/m 3̅ 2/m)
- Space group: Pm3̅m

Identification
- Formula mass: 387.60 g/mol
- Color: Yellow with reddish tint
- Fracture: Malleable
- Mohs scale hardness: 3 1/2
- Luster: Metallic
- Streak: yellow
- Diaphaneity: Opaque
- Ultraviolet fluorescence: Non-fluorescent

Auricupride is a natural alloy that combines copper and gold. Its chemical formula is Cu_{3}Au. The alloy crystallizes in the cubic crystal system in the L1_{2} structure type and occurs as malleable grains or platey masses. It is an opaque yellow with a reddish tint. It has a hardness of 3.5 and a specific gravity of 11.5.

A variant called tetra-auricupride (CuAu) exists. Silver may be present resulting in the variety argentocuproauride (Cu_{3}(Au,Ag)).

It was first described in 1950 for an occurrence in the Ural Mountains in Russia. It occurs as low temperature unmixing product in serpentinites and as reduction "halos" in redbed deposits. It is most often found in Chile, Argentina, Tasmania, Russia, Cyprus, Switzerland and South Africa.
