= Beta-tungsten =

Metastable phase of tungsten

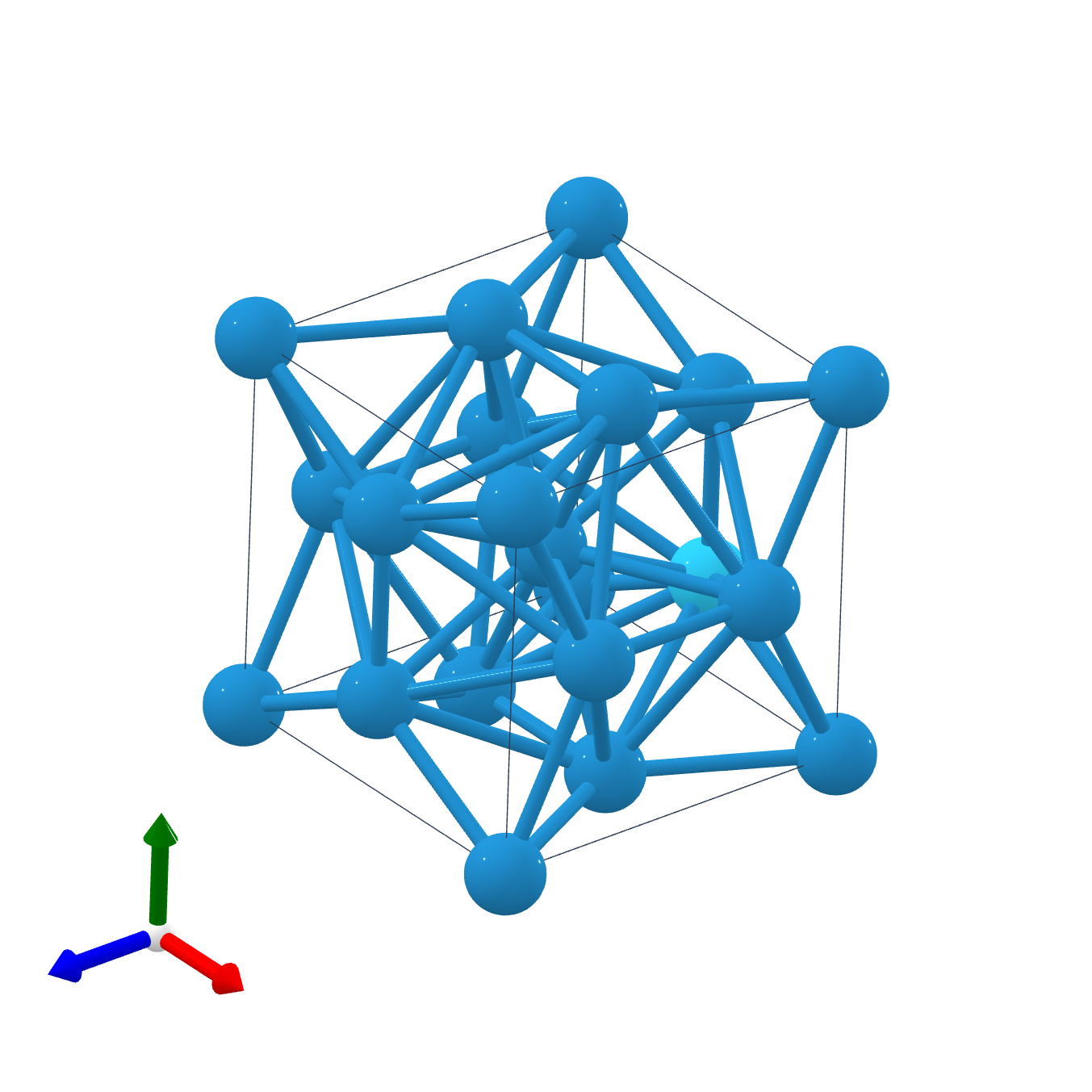
The unit cell of beta-tungsten

Beta-tungsten (β-W) is a metastable phase of tungsten widely observed in tungsten thin films. While the commonly existing stable alpha-tungsten (α-W) has a body-centered cubic (A2) structure, β-W adopts the topologically close-packed A15 structure containing eight atoms per unit cell, and it irreversibly transforms to the stable α phase through thermal annealing of up to 650 °C. It has been found that β-W possesses the giant spin Hall effect, wherein the applied charge current generates a transverse spin current, and this leads to potential applications in magnetoresistive random access memory devices.

== History ==
β-W was first observed by Hartmann et al. in 1931 as part of the dendritic metallic deposit formed on the cathode after electrolysis of phosphate melts below 650°C. In the beginning stages of research into β-W, oxygen was commonly found to promote the formation of the β-W structure, thus discussions of whether the β-W structure is a phase of single-element tungsten or a tungsten suboxide were long-standing, but ever since the 1950s there has been a lot of experimental proof showing that the oxygen in β-W thin films is in a zero valence state, and thus the structure is a true allotrope of tungsten.

While the initial interest in β-W thin films was driven by its superconducting properties at low temperatures, the discovery of giant spin Hall effect in β-W thin films by Burhman et al. in 2012 has generated new interest in the material for potential applications in spintronic magnetic random access memories and spin-logic devices.

== Structure ==
β-W has a cubic A15 structure with space group $Pm\bar{3}n$, which belongs to the Frank–Kasper phases family. Each unit cell contains eight tungsten atoms. The structure can be seen as a cubic lattice with one atom at each corner, one atom in the center, and two atoms on each face. There are two inequivalent tungsten sites corresponding to Wyckoff positions $2a$ and $6c$, respectively. On the first site, Wyckoff position $2a$, each tungsten atom is bonded to twelve equivalent W atoms to form a mixture of edge- and face-sharing WW_{12} cuboctahedratungsten. On the second site, with Wyckoff position $6c$, each tungsten atom is bonded to fourteen neighboring tungsten atoms, and there is a spread of W–W bond lengths ranging from 2.54 to 3.12 Å. The experimentally measured lattice parameter of β-W is 5.036 Å, while the DFT calculated value is 5.09 Å.

== Properties ==
Two key properties of β-W have been well-established: the high electrical resistivity and the giant spin Hall effect.

Although the exact value depends on the preparation conditions, β-W has an electrical resistivity of at least five to ten times higher than that of α-W (5.3 μΩ.cm), and this high conductivity will remain almost unchanged in a temperature range of 5 to 380 K, making β-W a potential thin film resistor while α-W is a thin film conductor.

Thin films of β-W display a giant spin Hall effect with a spin Hall angle of 0.30 ± 0.02 and a spin-diffusion length of around 3.5 nm. In contrast, α-W exhibits a much smaller spin Hall angle of less than 0.07 and a comparable spin-diffusion length. In the spin Hall effect, the application of a longitudinal electric current through a nonmagnetic material generates a transverse spin current due to the spin–orbit interaction, and the spin Hall angle is defined as the ratio of the transverse spin current density and the longitudinal electric current density. The spin Hall angle of β-W is large enough to generate spin torques capable of flipping or setting the magnetization of adjacent magnetic layers into precession by means of the spin Hall effect.

== Preparation ==
While there have been some reports about preparing β-W with chemical methods such as hydrogen reduction reaction, almost all the reported β-W in the recent thirty years are prepared through sputter deposition, an atom-by-atom physical vapor deposition (PVD) technique. In the sputter deposition, a tungsten target is bombarded with ionized gas molecules (usually Ar), causing the tungsten atoms to be “sputtered” off into the plasma. These vaporized atoms are then deposited when they condense as a thin film on the substrate to be coated. The formation of β-W through sputter deposition depends on the base pressure, Ar pressure, substrate temperature, impurity gas, deposition rate, film thickness, substrate type, etc. It has been widely observed that oxygen or nitrogen gas flow can assist and is necessary for the formation of β-W, but recently there have also been reports on preparing β-W without putting into any impurity gas during deposition.
