= Journal of Alloys and Compounds =

- Discipline: Materials science
- Language: English
- Edited by: Hongge Pan, Livio Battezzati

Publication details
- Former name: Journal of the Less-Common Metals
- History: 1958-present
- Publisher: Elsevier
- Frequency: 40/year
- Impact factor: 6.371 (2021)

Standard abbreviations
- ISO 4: J. Alloys Compd.

Indexing
- CODEN: JALCEU
- ISSN: 0925-8388
- LCCN: sf93093451
- OCLC no.: 263608199

Links
- Journal homepage; Online archive

The Journal of Alloys and Compounds is a peer-reviewed scientific journal covering experimental and theoretical approaches to materials problems that involve compounds and alloys. It is published by Elsevier and the editor-in-chief is Hongge Pan, Livio Battezzati. It was the first journal established to focus specifically on a group of inorganic elements.

== History ==
The journal was established by William Hume-Rothery in 1958 as the Journal of the Less-Common Metals, focussing on the chemical elements in the rows of the periodic table for the Actinide and Lanthanide series. The lanthanides are sometimes referred to as the rare earths. The journal was not strictly limited to articles about those specific elements: it also included papers about the preparation and use of other elements and alloys.

The journal developed out of an international symposium on metals and alloys above 1200 °C which Hume-Rothery organized at Oxford University on September 17–18, 1958. The conference included more than 100 participants from several countries. The papers presented at the symposium "The study of metals and alloys above 1200°C" were published as volume 1 of the journal. It was the first journal dealing specifically with a category of inorganic elements.

The title of "Less-Common Metals" was something of a misnomer, since these metals are actually found fairly commonly, but in small amounts. The journal obtained its current name in 1991 and is considered a particularly rich source of information on hydrogen-metal systems.

== Retractions ==
In 2017, Elsevier was reported to be retracting 3 papers from the journal, which was one of several to be affected by falsified reviews, which led to a broader discussion of the processes for reviewing journal articles.

== Abstracting and indexing ==
The journal is abstracted and indexed in:

- Chemical Abstracts Service
- Current Contents/Physical, Chemical & Earth Sciences
- Science Citation Index
- Scopus

According to the Journal Citation Reports, the journal has a 2022 impact factor of 6.371.
