= Chromium(II) carbide =

Chromium carbide
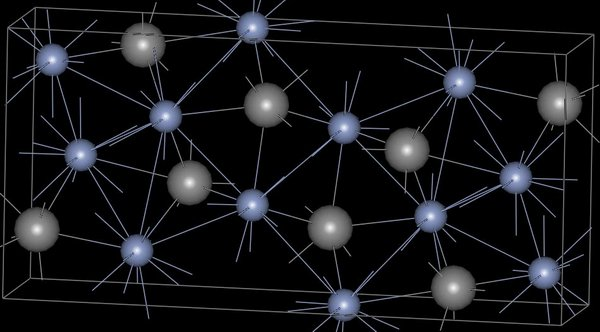

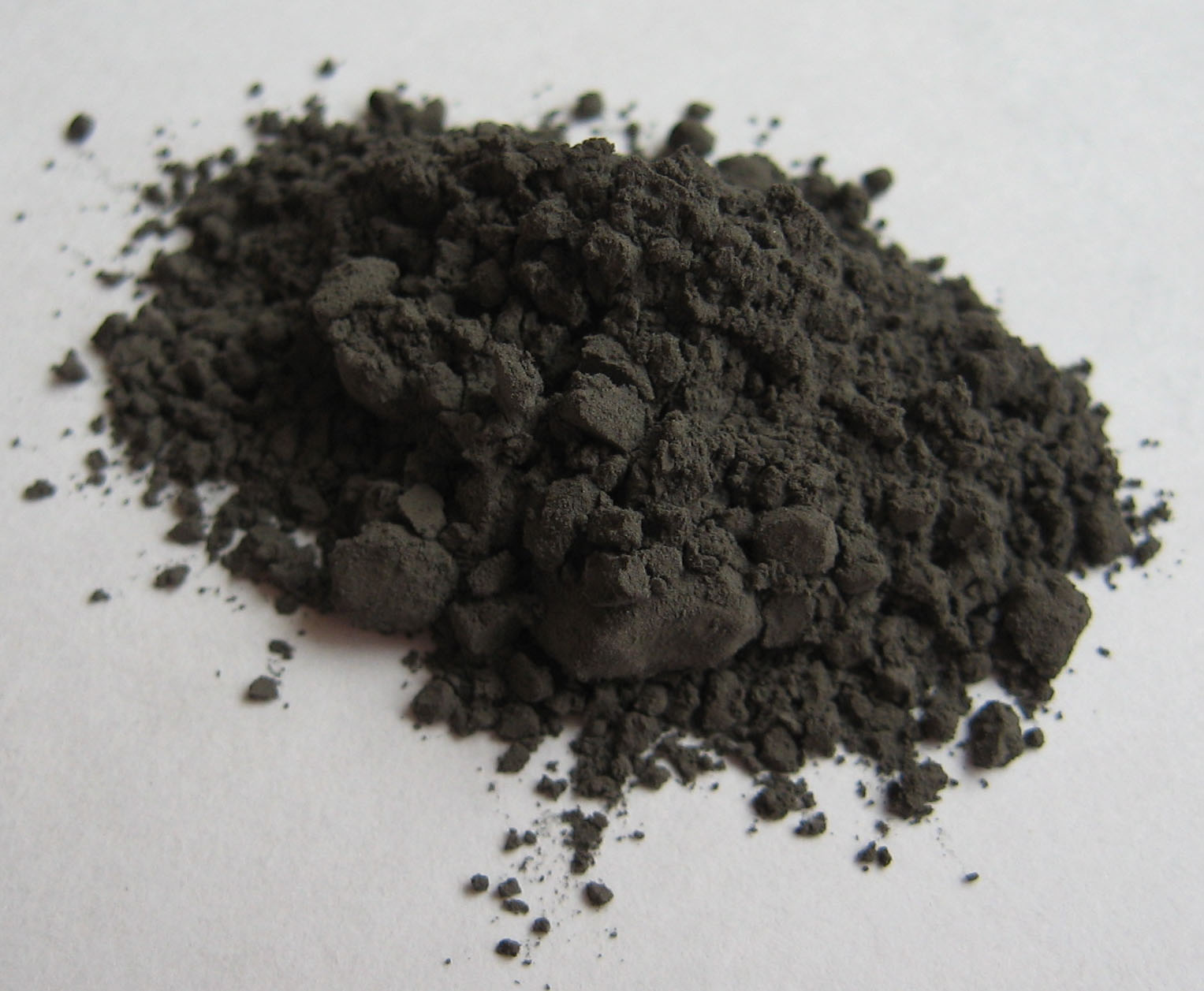

Names
- IUPAC name Chromium(II) carbide
- Other names Chromium carbide

Identifiers
CAS Number	12012-35-0
3D model (JSmol)	Interactive image
ChemSpider	21171152
ECHA InfoCard	100.031.420
PubChem CID	3650773
CompTox Dashboard (EPA)	DTXSID2093954
- InChI: InChI=1S/2C.3Cr Key: UFGZSIPAQKLCGR-UHFFFAOYSA-N; InChI=1/2C.3Cr/rC2Cr3/c3-1-5-2-4 Key: UFGZSIPAQKLCGR-HMFAXLTNAU
- SMILES: [Cr]#C[Cr]C#[Cr]

Properties
Chemical formula	Cr_{3}C_{2}
Molar mass	180.009 g/mol
Appearance	gray orthorhombic crystals
Density	6.68 g/cm^{3}
Melting point	1,895 °C (3,443 °F; 2,168 K)
Boiling point	3,800 °C (6,870 °F; 4,070 K)
Solubility in water	reacts

Structure
Crystal structure	Orthorhombic, oP20
Space group	Pnma, No. 62

Hazards
NFPA 704 (fire diamond)	1 2 1
- NIOSH (US health exposure limits)
PEL (Permissible)	TWA 1 mg/m^{3}
REL (Recommended)	TWA 0.5 mg/m^{3}
IDLH (Immediate danger)	250 mg/m^{3}
- Except where otherwise noted, data are given for materials in their standard state (at 25 °C [77 °F], 100 kPa). verify (what is ?) Infobox references

Chromium(II) carbide is a ceramic compound that exists in several chemical compositions: Cr_{3}C_{2}, Cr_{7}C_{3}, and Cr_{23}C_{6}. At standard conditions it exists as a gray solid. It is extremely hard and corrosion resistant. It is also a refractory compound, which means that it retains its strength at high temperatures as well. These properties make it useful as an additive to metal alloys. When chromium carbide crystals are integrated into the surface of a metal it improves the wear resistance and corrosion resistance of the metal, and maintains these properties at elevated temperatures. The hardest and most commonly used composition for this purpose is Cr_{3}C_{2}.

The mineral form of the Cr_{3}C_{2} compound is tongbaite. Isovite, (Cr,Fe)_{23}C_{6}, is a related mineral. Both are extremely rare. Yet another chromium-rich carbide mineral is yarlongite, Cr_{4}Fe_{4}NiC_{4}.

== Properties ==
There are three different crystal structures for chromium carbide corresponding to the three different chemical compositions. Cr_{23}C_{6} has a cubic crystal structure and a Vickers hardness of 976 kg/mm^{2}. Cr_{7}C_{3} has a hexagonal crystal structure and a microhardness of 1336 kg/mm^{2}. Cr_{3}C_{2} is the most durable of the three compositions, and has an orthorhombic crystal structure with a microhardness of 2280 kg/mm^{2}. For this reason Cr_{3}C_{2} is the primary form of chromium carbide used in surface treatment.

== Synthesis ==
Synthesis of chromium carbide can be achieved through mechanical alloying. In this type of process metallic chromium and pure carbon in the form of graphite are loaded into a ball mill and ground into a fine powder. After the components have been ground they are pressed into a pellet and subjected to hot isostatic pressing. Hot isostatic pressing utilizes an inert gas, primarily argon, in a sealed oven. This pressurized gas applies pressure to the sample from all directions while the oven is heated. The heat and pressure cause the graphite and metallic chromium to react and form chromium carbide. Decreasing the percentage of carbon content in the initial mixture results in an increase in the yield of the Cr_{7}C_{3}, and Cr_{23}C_{6} forms of chromium carbide.

Another method for the synthesis of chromium carbide utilizes chromium oxide, pure aluminum, and graphite in a self-propagating exothermic reaction that proceeds as follows:

3Cr_{2}O_{3} + 6Al + 4C → 2Cr_{3}C_{2} + 3Al_{2}O_{3}

In this method the reactants are ground and blended in a ball mill. The blended powder is then pressed into a pellet and placed under an inert atmosphere of argon. The sample is then heated. A heated wire, a spark, a laser, or an oven may provide the heat. The exothermic reaction is initiated, and the resulting heat propagates the reaction throughout the rest of the sample.

== Uses ==
Chromium carbide is useful in the surface treatment of metal components. Chromium carbide is used to coat the surface of another metal in a technique known as thermal spraying. Cr_{3}C_{2} powder is mixed with solid nickel-chromium. This mixture is then heated to very high temperatures and sprayed onto the object being coated where it forms a protective layer. This layer is essentially its own metal matrix composite, consisting of hard ceramic Cr_{3}C_{2} particles embedded in a nickel-chromium matrix. The matrix itself contributes to the corrosion resistance of the coating because both nickel and chromium are corrosion resistant in their metallic form. After over spraying the coating, the coated part must run through a diffusion heat treatment to reach the best results in matter of coupling strength to the base metal and also in matter of hardness.

Another technique utilizes chromium carbide in the form of overlay plates. These are prefabricated chromium carbide-coated steel plates, which are meant to be welded onto existing structures or machinery in order to improve performance.

Chromium carbide is used as an additive in cutting tools made of cemented carbides, in order to improve hardness by preventing the growth of large grains. The primary constituent in most extremely hard cutting tools is tungsten carbide. The tungsten carbide is combined with other carbides such as titanium carbide, niobium carbide, and chromium carbide and sintered together with a cobalt matrix. Cr_{3}C_{2} prevents large grains from forming in the composite, which results in a fine-grained structure of superior hardness.

Undesired formation of chromium carbides in stainless steel and other alloys can lead to intergranular corrosion.
