= Frank–Kasper phases =

Particular class of intermetallic phases

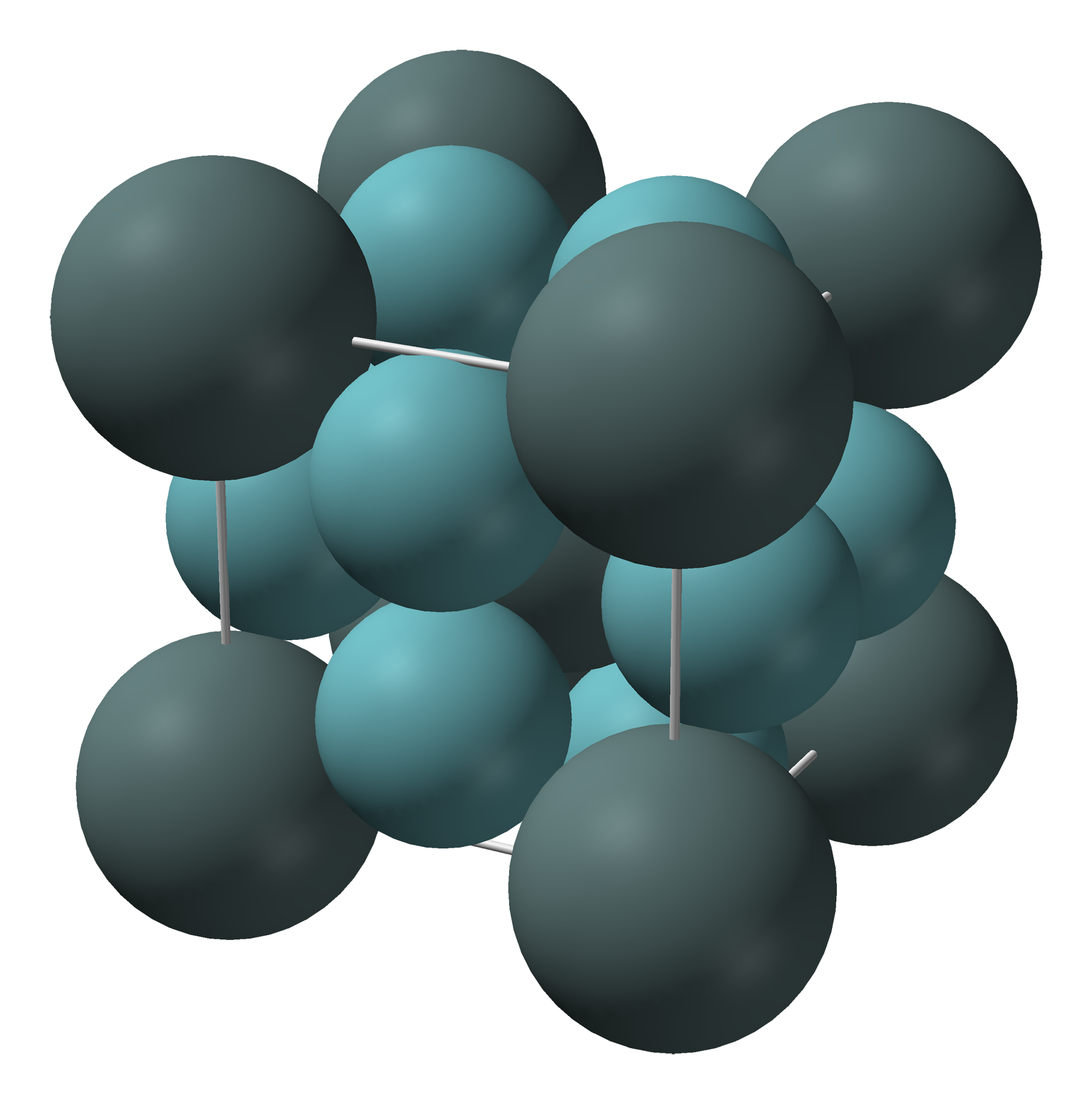
Unit cell of the A15 phases of Nb_{3}Sn

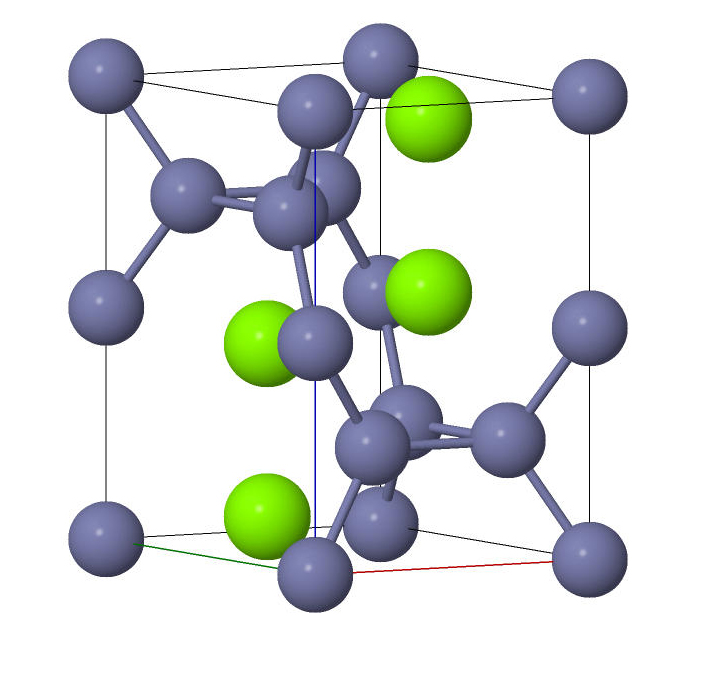
Unit cell of Laves phase with MgZn_{2} structure (Mg atoms are green).

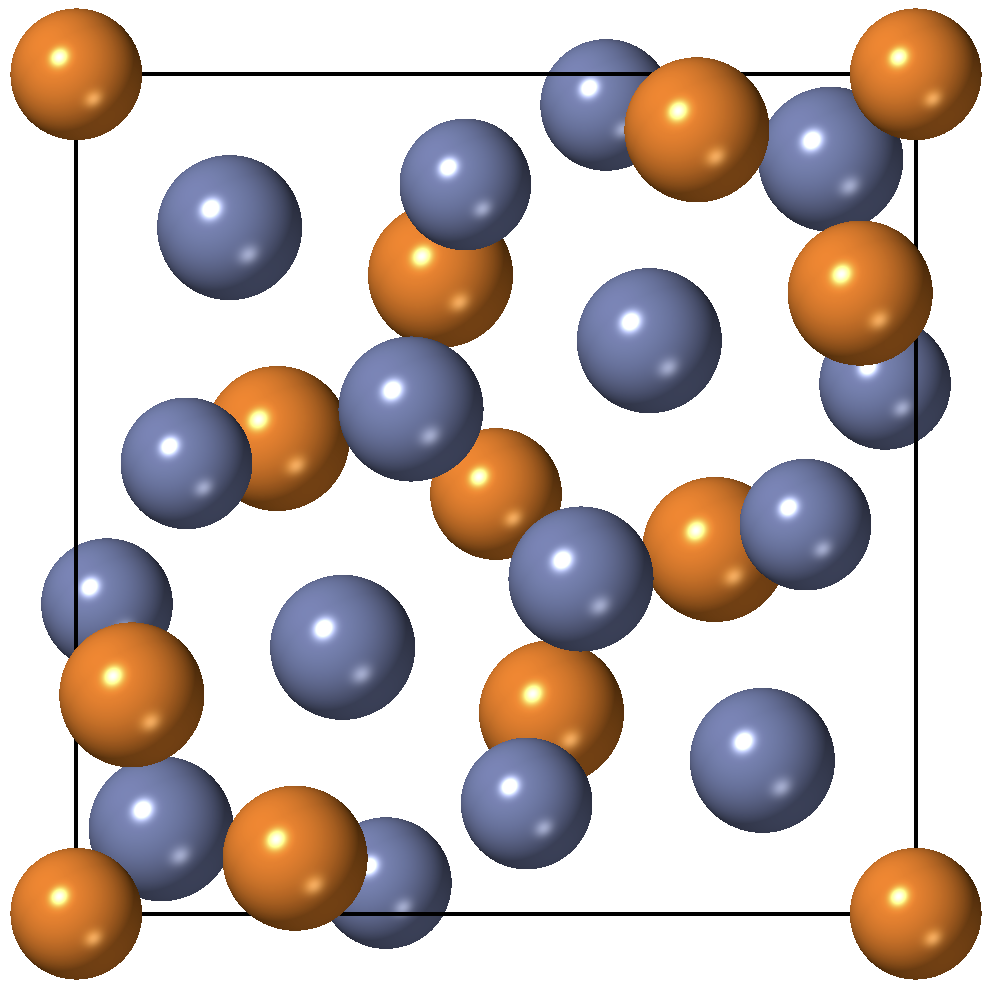
Projection of unit cell of sigma phase with CrFe structure along c axis

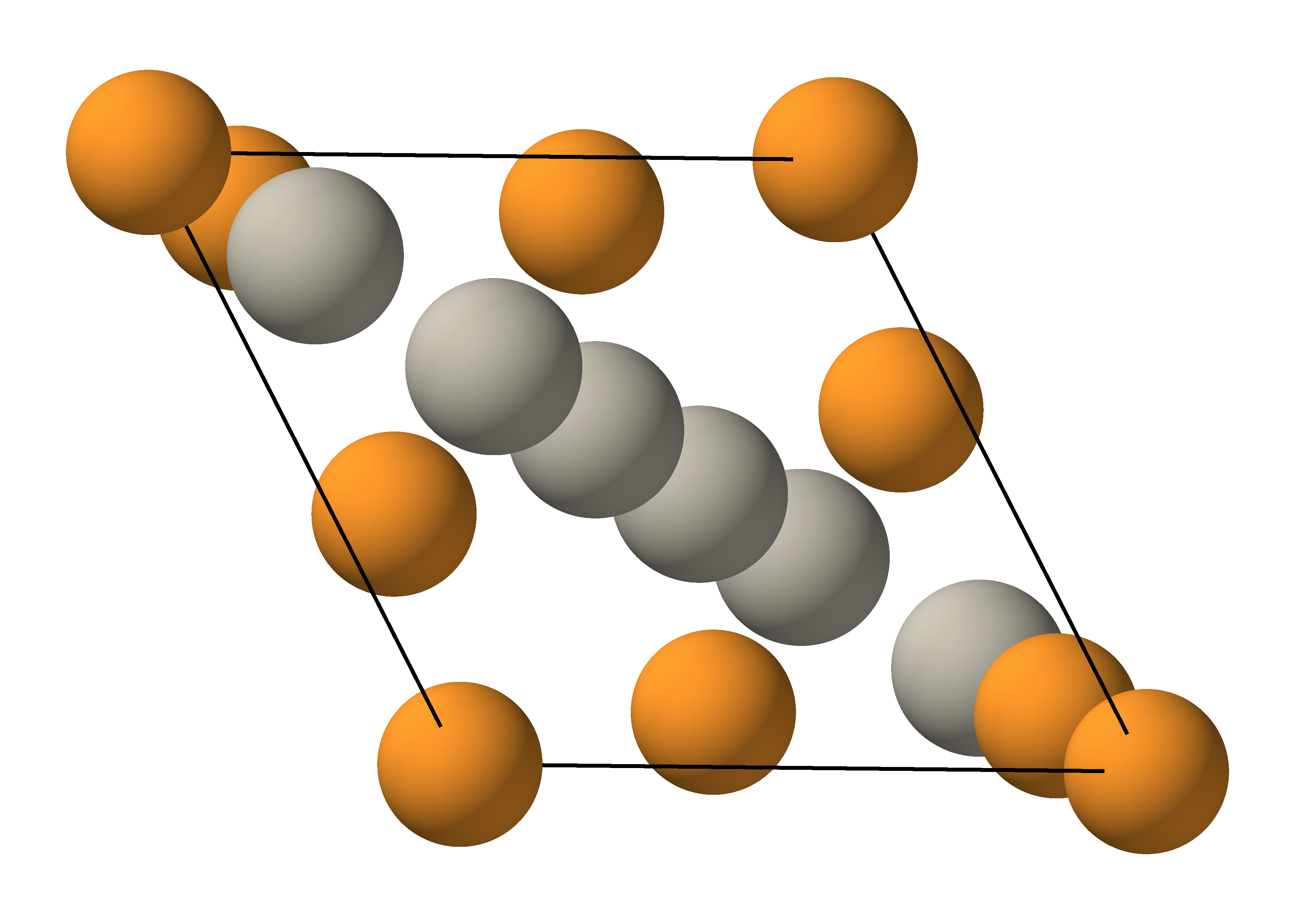
Unit cell of μ phase with W_{6}Fe_{7} structure projected along c-axis.

Topologically close packed (TCP) phases, also known as Frank-Kasper (FK) phases, are one of the largest groups of intermetallic compounds, known for their complex crystallographic structure and physical properties. Owing to their combination of periodic and aperiodic structure, some TCP phases belong to the class of quasicrystals. Applications of TCP phases as high-temperature structural and superconducting materials have been highlighted; however, they have not yet been sufficiently investigated for details of their physical properties. Also, their complex and often non-stoichiometric structure makes them good subjects for theoretical calculations.

== History ==
In 1958, Charles Frank and John S. Kasper, in their original work investigating many complex alloy structures, showed that non-icosahedral environments form an open-end network which they called the major skeleton, and is now identified as the declination locus. They came up with the methodology to pack asymmetric icosahedra into crystals using other polyhedra with larger coordination numbers. These coordination polyhedra were constructed to maintain topological close packing (TCP).

== Unit-cell geometries classification ==
Based on the tetrahedral units, FK crystallographic structures are classified into low and high polyhedral groups denoted by their coordination numbers (CN) referring to the number of atoms centering the polyhedron. Some atoms have an icosahedral structure with low coordination, labeled CN12. Some others have higher coordination numbers of 14, 15 and 16, labeled CN14, CN15, and CN16, respectively. These atoms with higher coordination numbers form uninterrupted networks connected along the directions where the five-fold icosahedral symmetry is replaced by six-fold local symmetry. The sites of 12-coordination are called minor sites and those with more than 12-fold coordination are major sites.

== Classic FK phases ==
The most common members of a FK-phases family are: A15, Laves phases, σ, μ, M, P, and R.

=== A15 phases ===
A15 phases are intermetallic alloys with an average coordination number (ACN) of 13.5 and eight A_{3}B stoichiometry atoms per unit cell where two B atoms are surrounded by CN12 polyhedral (icosahedra), and six A atoms are surrounded by CN14 polyhedral. Nb_{3}Ge is a superconductor with A15 structure.

=== Laves phases ===
The three Laves phases are intermetallic compounds composed of CN12 and CN16 polyhedra with AB_{2} stoichiometry, commonly seen in binary metal systems like MgZn_{2}. Due to the small solubility of AB_{2} structures, Laves phases are almost line compounds, though sometimes they can have a wide homogeneity region.

=== σ, μ, M, P, and R phases ===
The sigma (σ) phase is an intermetallic compound known as the one without definite stoichiometric composition and formed at the electron/atom ratio range of 6.2 to 7. It has a primitive tetragonal unit cell with 30 atoms. CrFe is a typical alloy crystallizing in the σ phase at the equiatomic composition. With physical properties adjustable based on its structural components, or its chemical composition provided a given structure.

The μ phase has an ideal A_{6}B_{7} stoichiometry, with its prototype W_{6}Fe_{7}, containing rhombohedral cell with 13 atoms. While many other Frank-Kasper alloy types have been identified, more continue to be found. The alloy Nb_{10}Ni_{9}Al_{3} is the prototype for the M phase. It has orthorhombic space group with 52 atoms per unit cell. The alloy Cr_{9}Mo_{21}Ni_{20} is the prototype for the P-phase. It has a primitive orthorhombic cell with 56 atoms. The alloy Co_{5}Cr_{2}Mo_{3} is the prototype for the R-phase which belongs to the rhombohedral space group with 53 atoms per cell.

Beyond metallic systems, the μ phase has also been observed in self-assembled soft matter, such as discotic molecular pentagons, alongside a newly reported non-metallic Frank–Kasper ϕ phase.

== Applications ==
FK phase materials have been pointed out for their high-temperature structure and as superconducting materials. Their complex and often non-stoichiometric structure makes them good subjects for theoretical calculations. A15, Laves and σ are the most applicable FK structures with interesting fundamental properties.

The A15 compounds include important intermetallic superconductors such as: Nb_{3}Sn, Nb_{3}Al, and V_{3}Ga with applications including wires for high-field superconducting magnets. Nb_{3}Sn is also being investigated as a potential material for fabricating superconducting radio frequency cavities. Other notable materials that take the A15 structure include β-W, which exhibits a giant spin Hall effect.

Small extents of σ phase considerably decreases the flexibility and impairment in erosion resistance. While addition of refractory elements like W, Mo, or Re to FK phases helps to enhance the thermal properties in such alloys as steels or nickel-based superalloys, it increases the risk of unwanted precipitation in intermetallic compounds.

== See also ==
- Frank-Kasper phases (soft matter)
- Complex metallic alloys
