= Intermetallic particle =

Particles formed within metal alloys

Intermetallic particles form during solidification of metallic alloys.

== Aluminium alloys ==
=== Al-Si-Cu-Mg alloys ===
Al-Si-Cu-Mg alloys form Al5FeSi- plate like intermetallic phases like -Al_{8}Fe_{2}Si, Al_{2}Cu, etc. The size and morphology of these intermetallic phases in these alloys control the mechanical properties of these alloys, especially strength and ductility. The size of these phases depends on the secondary dendrite arm spacing, as well as the Si content of the alloy, of the primary phase in the micro structure.

==== Phases and crystal structures ====
Phase	Structure	Space Group	a	b	c	α	β	γ	..
α-Al_{8}Fe_{2}Si	hexagonal	p63/mmc(194)	12.404	12.404	26.234	90	90	120	..
β-Al_{5}FeSi	monoclinic	2/m	6.16760	6.1661	20.8093	..	..	91	..
Al_{2}Cu	..	..	..	..	..	..	..	..	..

== Magnesium alloys ==
=== WE 43 ===
In-situ synchrotron diffraction experiment on Electron alloy-WE 43 (Mg4Y3Nd) shows that this alloy form the following intermetallic phases; Mg12Nd, Mg14Y4Nd, and Mg24Y5.

==== Phases and crystal structures ====
Phase	Structure	Space Group	a	b	c	α	β	γ	..
Mg_{41}Nd_{5}	..	..	..	..	..	..	..	..	..
β-Mg_{14}Nd_{2}Y	face centered cubic		2.2 nm			..	..		..
Mg_{24}Y_{5}	body centered cubic	..	1.12 nm	..	..	..	..	..	..
