= Geoffrey Raynor =

Geoffrey Vincent Raynor FRS (2 October 1913 – 20 October 1983) was an English metallurgist and university academic.

== Life ==
Raynor was educated at Nottingham High School before studying Chemistry at Keble College, Oxford, obtaining a first-class degree in 1936. He then worked as a research assistant at the University of Oxford, working with William Hume-Rothery, and carried out metallurgical research for the Ministry of Supply and Ministry of Aircraft Production during the Second World War. In 1945, he moved to the University of Birmingham as a research fellow, with the course that he taught in structural and theoretical metallurgy becoming "the forerunner for the development of metallurgical teaching all over the world". He was made Reader of Theoretical Metallurgy in 1947 and Professor of Metal Physics in 1949. He was the Feeney Professor of Physical Metallurgy from 1955 to 1969, and was also head of the Department of Physical Metallurgy and Science of Materials during this latter period. He also served the university as dean of the Faculty of Science and Engineering and then Deputy Principal for four years. He retired from the university in 1981, and was made an emeritus professor.

Raynor was elected as a Fellow of the Royal Society in 1959 and a Fellow of the New York Academy of Sciences in 1961; he was made an Honorary Fellow of Keble in 1972. He was a visiting professor at various times at Chicago University, Ohio State University, Witwatersrand University, and the University of New South Wales.

The Times said of him that his research gained "international acclaim" and that he had "played a leading part in the development of the chemistry of alloy phases", with his contributions to the subject "likely to be included in the teaching of metallurgy and to be of practical value for many decades."
