= MgCu2 =

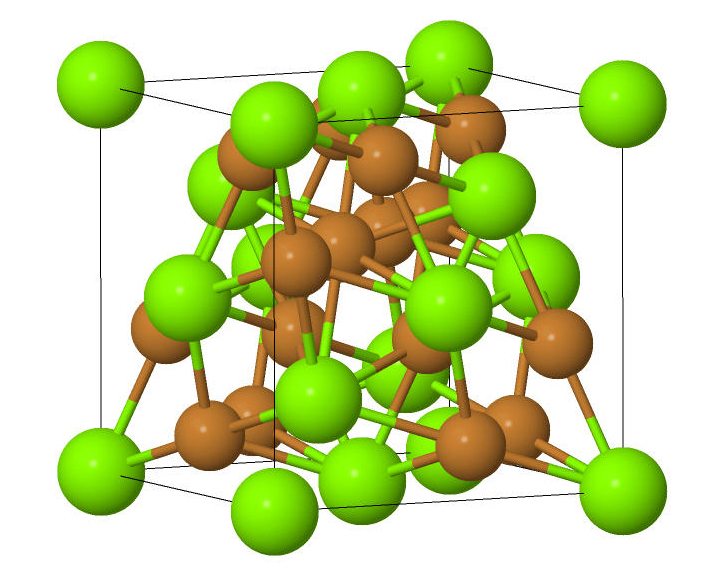
- The crystal structure of MgCu_{2}. Magnesium is shown in green, copper in brown.

Names
- IUPAC name Copper - magnesium (2:1)

Identifiers
CAS Number	12054-17-0
3D model (JSmol)	Interactive image
ChemSpider	57534863
PubChem CID	71355210
CompTox Dashboard (EPA)	DTXSID40779642
- InChI: InChI=1S/2Cu.Mg Key: BSBUOWMDDLTWGL-UHFFFAOYSA-N
- SMILES: [Mg].[Cu].[Cu]

Properties
Chemical formula	Cu_{2}Mg
Molar mass	151.397 g·mol^{−1}
Density	5.96 g/cm^{3}
Melting point	520 °C (968 °F; 793 K)

Structure
Crystal structure	Cubic (227)
Space group	Fd3̅m
Point group	m3̅m
Lattice constant	a = 6.96 Å, b = 6.96 Å, c = 6.96 Å α = 90°, β = 90°, γ = 90°
Lattice volume (V)	337.49 Å
Formula units (Z)	8
Coordination geometry	12-coordinate at Mg to equivalent Cu atoms.; Mixture of corner, edge, and face sharing CuMg_{6}Cu_{6} cuboctahedra to 6 Mg and 6 Cu at Cu.
- Except where otherwise noted, data are given for materials in their standard state (at 25 °C [77 °F], 100 kPa). Infobox references

MgCu_{2} is a binary intermetallic compound of magnesium (Mg) and copper (Cu) adopting cubic crystal structure, more specifically the C15 Laves phase.

== Preparation ==
MgCu_{2} can be prepared by hydrogenation of Mg_{2}Cu:

2 Mg_{2}Cu + 3 H_{2} → 3 MgH_{2} + MgCu_{2}

Or by the reaction of magnesium hydride and metallic copper at elevated temperature and pressure:

MgH_{2} + 2 Cu → MgCu_{2} + H_{2}

MgCu_{2} can also be prepared by heating magnesium and excess copper at about 380 °C (716 °F).

== Properties ==
MgCu_{2} can react with boron or its oxide to form magnesium borides after mechanical ball milling and heating. It can also react with magnesium hydride to produce orthorhombic Mg_{2}Cu, liberating hydrogen.

== See also ==
- Laves phase
