= William Hume-Rothery =

British metallurgist and materials scientist (1899–1968)

- Born: 15 May 1899; Worcester Park, Surrey, UK
- Died: 27 September 1968 (aged 69); Oxford, UK
- Education: University of Oxford; Royal School of Mines
- Known for: Hume-Rothery rules
- Awards: Francis C. Clamer Medal (1947); Fellow of the Royal Society (1937); Beilby Medal and Prize (1934)
- Scientific career
- Fields: Metallurgy
- Workplaces: University of Oxford
- Doctoral advisor: Harold Carpenter
- Doctoral students: Geoffrey Raynor

William Hume-Rothery (15 May 1899 – 27 September 1968) was an English metallurgist and materials scientist who studied the constitution of alloys.

== Early life and education ==
Hume-Rothery was born the son of lawyer Joseph Hume-Rothery in Worcester Park, Surrey. His grandfather, William Rothery, was a clergyman. His grandmother, Mary Hume-Rothery, a leading campaigner against vaccination, was the daughter of Joseph Hume, a Scottish doctor and Radical Member of parliament. William spent his youth in Cheltenham and was educated at Cheltenham College. In 1917 he was made totally deaf by a virus infection. Nevertheless, he entered Magdalen College, Oxford, and obtained a first class Honours degree in chemistry. He also attended the Royal School of Mines and was awarded a PhD.

== Career ==
During World War II, he supervised numerous government contracts for work on aluminium and magnesium alloys.

After the war he returned to Oxford "to carry on research in intermetallic compounds and problems on the borderland of metallography and chemistry" and remained there for the rest of his working life. In 1938 he was appointed lecturer in metallurgical chemistry. In his research, he concluded that the microstructure of an alloy depends on the sizes of the component atoms, as well as the valency electron concentration, and electrochemical differences. This led to the definition of the Hume-Rothery rules.

In the 1950s he founded the Department of Metallurgy (which is now the Department of Materials) at the University of Oxford, and was a fellow of St Edmund Hall, Oxford. He was also involved in founding the Journal of the Less-Common Metals, which developed out of an international symposium on metals and alloys above 1200 °C that he organised at Oxford University on 17–18 September 1958. The papers presented at the symposium "The study of metals and alloys above 1200°C" were published as Volume 1 of the Journal of the Less-Common Metals.

He was a member of the Oxford Philatelic Society.

== Selected publications ==
- Electrons, atoms, metals, and alloys (1948, 1955, 1963)
  - Polish edition: Elektrony, atomy, metale i stopy (translated by Romuald Romicki, 1955)
  - French edition: Électrons, atomes, métaux et alliages (translated by G. Hilly, 1959)
- Elements of structural metallurgy (1961)
  - Russian edition: Введение в физическое металловедение (translated by V.M. Glazov and S.M. Gorin, 1965)

== William Hume-Rothery Award ==
The William Hume-Rothery Award has since 1974 been awarded annually by The Minerals, Metals & Materials Society.

== Honours and awards ==
- Hume-Rothery was elected a Fellow of the Royal Society in May, 1937
- Awarded the Francis J. Clamer Medal in 1949.

== Personal life and retirement ==
He married Elizabeth Fea in 1931; they had a daughter Jennifer in 1934. He retired in 1966 and died in 1968.
