= Cr23C6 crystal structure =

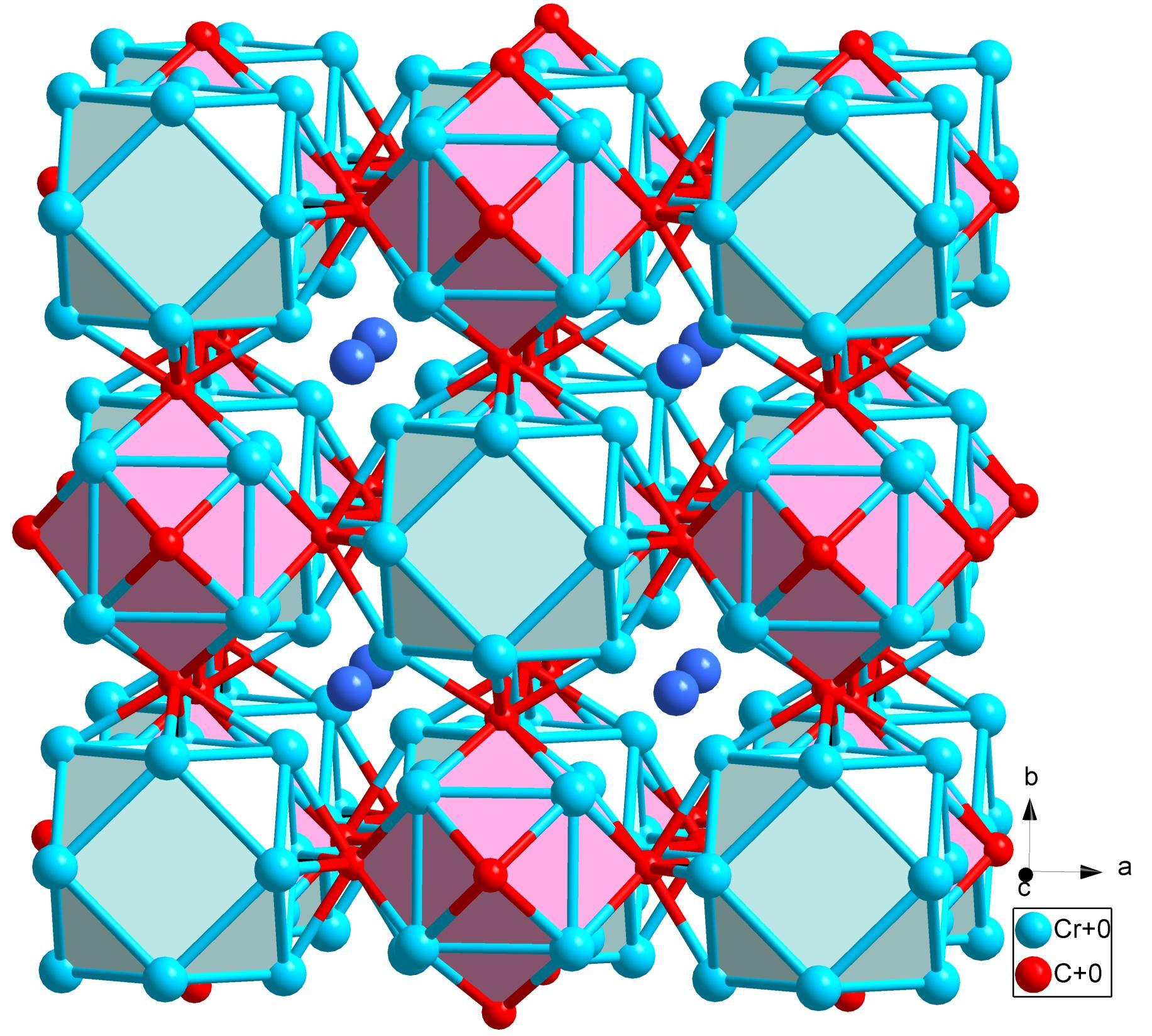
The Cr_{23}C_{6} structure represented as polyhedra of atoms. The blue surfaces outline cuboctahedra of chromium atoms, whereas the red surfaces outline chromium cubes capped by carbon atoms. The darker blue spheres represent chromium atoms outside of the polyhedra.

Cr_{23}C_{6} is the prototypical compound of a common crystal structure, discovered in 1933 as part of the chromium-carbon binary phase diagram. Over 85 known compounds adopt this structure type, which can be described as a NaCl-like packing of chromium cubes and cuboctahedra.

== Structure ==
The space group of this structure is called Fm3̅m (in Hermann–Mauguin notation) or "225" (in the International Tables for Crystallography). It belongs to a cubic crystal system, with Pearson symbol cF116.

The shortest interatomic distances are between carbon and chromium atoms, which is expected on the basis of atomic size. The carbon atoms are in positions that cap each face of the chromium cubes and their coordination environment can be thought of as distorted square antiprisms formed from chromium atoms of both the cubes and the cuboctahedra.

The closest Cr-Cr contacts are between members of a cuboctahedron, and the third closest are between members of a cube. The members of the cube, however, are closer to the 8 chromium atoms in the unit cell that are not part of either polyhedron. The coordination environment of these other atoms can be thought of as distorted Friauf polyhedra composed of chromium atoms, if next-nearest neighbors are included.

== Materials ==
Examples of compounds that form in this structure type include Cr_{23}C_{6}, Mn_{23}C_{6}, and many ternary intermetallic carbides and borides. A few phases of ternary silicides, germanides, and phosphides are also known to exist. In going from the binary to ternary systems, some of the transition metal atoms are substituted by a third element, which can be an alkali metal, alkaline earth metal, rare-earth element, main group element, or another transition metal. This leads to an empirical formula of the form A_{23−x}B_{x}C_{6}. Materials of this kind continue to be studied for potentially interesting magnetic and physical properties.
