= Chromium(III) boride =

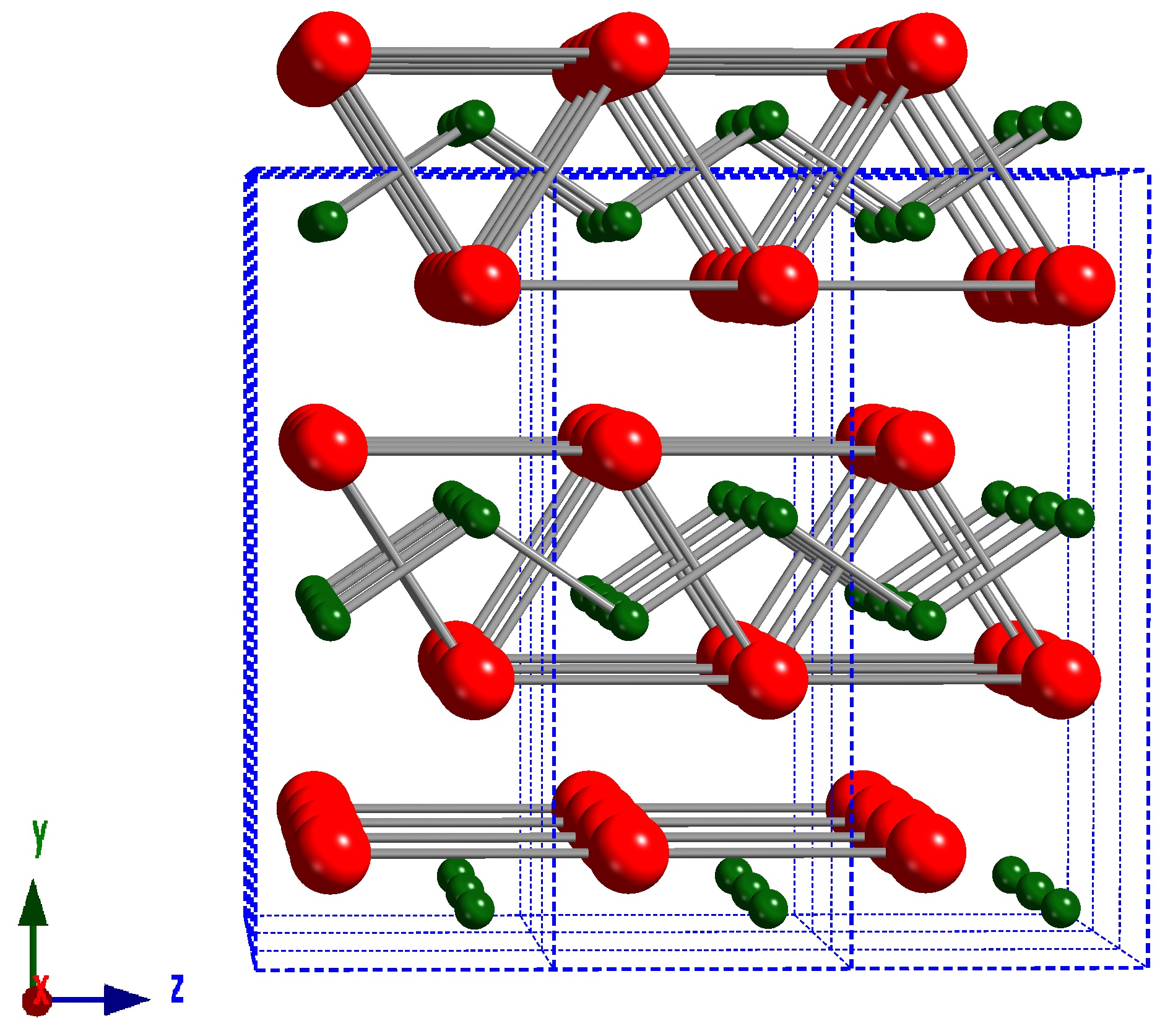
- Crystal structure

Names
- IUPAC name boranylidynechromium
- Other names Chromium monoboride

Identifiers
| CAS Number | 12006-79-0 |
| 3D model (JSmol) | Interactive image |
| ChemSpider | 74710 |
| ECHA InfoCard | 100.031.339 |
| EC Number | 234-487-8 |
| PubChem CID | 82788 |
- InChI: InChI=1S/Cr.B Key: NUEWEVRJMWXXFB-UHFFFAOYSA-N
- SMILES: B#[Cr]

Properties
| Chemical formula | CrB |
| Molar mass | 62.81 g/mol |
| Appearance | silver, ceramic material |
| Density | 6.17 g/cm^{3} |
| Melting point | 1,950 to 2,050 °C (3,540 to 3,720 °F; 2,220 to 2,320 K) |
| Solubility in water | insoluble |

Structure
| Crystal structure | orthorhombic (space group Cmcm) |

Hazards
| NFPA 704 (fire diamond) | 0 0 0 |
- NIOSH (US health exposure limits)
| PEL (Permissible) | TWA 1 mg/m^{3} |
| REL (Recommended) | TWA 0.5 mg/m^{3} |
| IDLH (Immediate danger) | 250 mg/m^{3} |
- Except where otherwise noted, data are given for materials in their standard state (at 25 °C [77 °F], 100 kPa). Infobox references

Chromium(III) boride, also known as chromium monoboride (CrB), is an inorganic compound with the chemical formula CrB. It is one of the six stable binary borides of chromium, which also include Cr_{2}B, Cr_{5}B_{3}, Cr_{3}B_{4}, CrB_{2}, and CrB_{4}. Like many other transition metal borides, it is extremely hard (21-23 GPa), has high strength (690 MPa bending strength), conducts heat and electricity as well as many metallic alloys, and has a high melting point (~2100 °C). Due to these properties, among others, CrB has been considered as a candidate material for wear resistant coatings and high-temperature diffusion barriers. Unlike pure chromium, CrB is known to be a paramagnetic, with a magnetic susceptibility that is only weakly dependent on temperature.

It can be synthesized as powders by many methods including direct reaction of the constituent elemental powders, self-propagating high-temperature synthesis (SHS), borothermic reduction, and molten salt growth. Slow-cooling of molten aluminum solutions from high-temperatures has been used to grow large single crystals, with a maximum size of 0.6 mm x 0.6 mm x 8.3 mm.

CrB has an orthorhombic crystal structure (space group Cmcm) that was first discovered in 1951, and subsequently confirmed by later work using single crystals. The crystal structure can be visualized as slabs face-sharing BCr_{6} trigonal prisms, in the ac-plane, that are stacked parallel to the <010> crystallographic direction. Similar to Cr_{3}B_{4} and Cr_{2}B_{3}, the B atoms in the structure form covalent bonds with each other and are characterized by unidirectional B-B- chains parallel to the <001> crystallographic direction. The transition metal monoborides VB, NbB, TaB, and NiB have the same crystal structure.
