= Hume-Rothery rules =

Rules for elements dissolving in a solid metal

Hume-Rothery rules are a set of basic rules that describe the conditions under which an element could dissolve in a metal, forming a solid solution. The rules are named after metallurgist William Hume-Rothery, who enumerated them in 1926. There are two sets of rules; one refers to substitutional solid solutions, and the other refers to interstitial solid solutions.

== Substitutional solid solution rules ==
For substitutional solid solutions, the Hume-Rothery rules are as follows:

1. The atomic radius of the solute and solvent atoms must differ by no more than 15%:
  $$\% \text{ difference} = \left ( \frac{r_\text{solute} - r_\text{solvent}}{r_\text{solvent}} \right ) \times 100\% \le 15\%.$$
2. The crystal structures of solute and solvent must be similar.
3. Complete solubility occurs when the solvent and solute have the same valency. A metal is more likely to dissolve a metal of higher valency, than vice versa.
4. The solute and solvent should have similar electronegativity. If the electronegativity difference is too great, the metals tend to form intermetallic compounds instead of solid solutions.

== Interstitial solid solution rules ==
For interstitial solid solutions, the Hume-Rothery rules are:

1. Solute atoms should have a smaller radius than 59% of the radius of solvent atoms.
2. The solute and solvent should have similar electronegativity.
3. Valency factor: two elements should have the same valence. The greater the difference in valence between solute and solvent atoms, the lower the solubility.

== Solid solution rules for multicomponent systems ==
Fundamentally, the Hume-Rothery rules are restricted to binary systems that form either substitutional or interstitial solid solutions. However, this approach limits assessing advanced alloys which are commonly multicomponent systems. Free energy diagrams (or phase diagrams) offer in-depth knowledge of equilibrium restraints in complex systems. In essence the Hume-Rothery rules (and Pauling's rules) are based on geometrical restraints. Likewise are the advancements being done to the Hume-Rothery rules. Where they are being considered as critical contact criterion describable with Voronoi diagrams. This could ease the theoretical phase diagram generation of multicomponent systems.

For alloys containing transition metal elements there is a difficulty in interpretation of the Hume-Rothery electron concentration rule, as the values of e/a values (number of itinerant electrons per atom) for transition metals have been quite controversial for a long time, and no satisfactory solutions have yet emerged.

== See also ==
- CALPHAD
- Enthalpy of mixing
- Gibbs energy
- Phase diagram
