= Laves phase =

Particular class of intermetallic phases

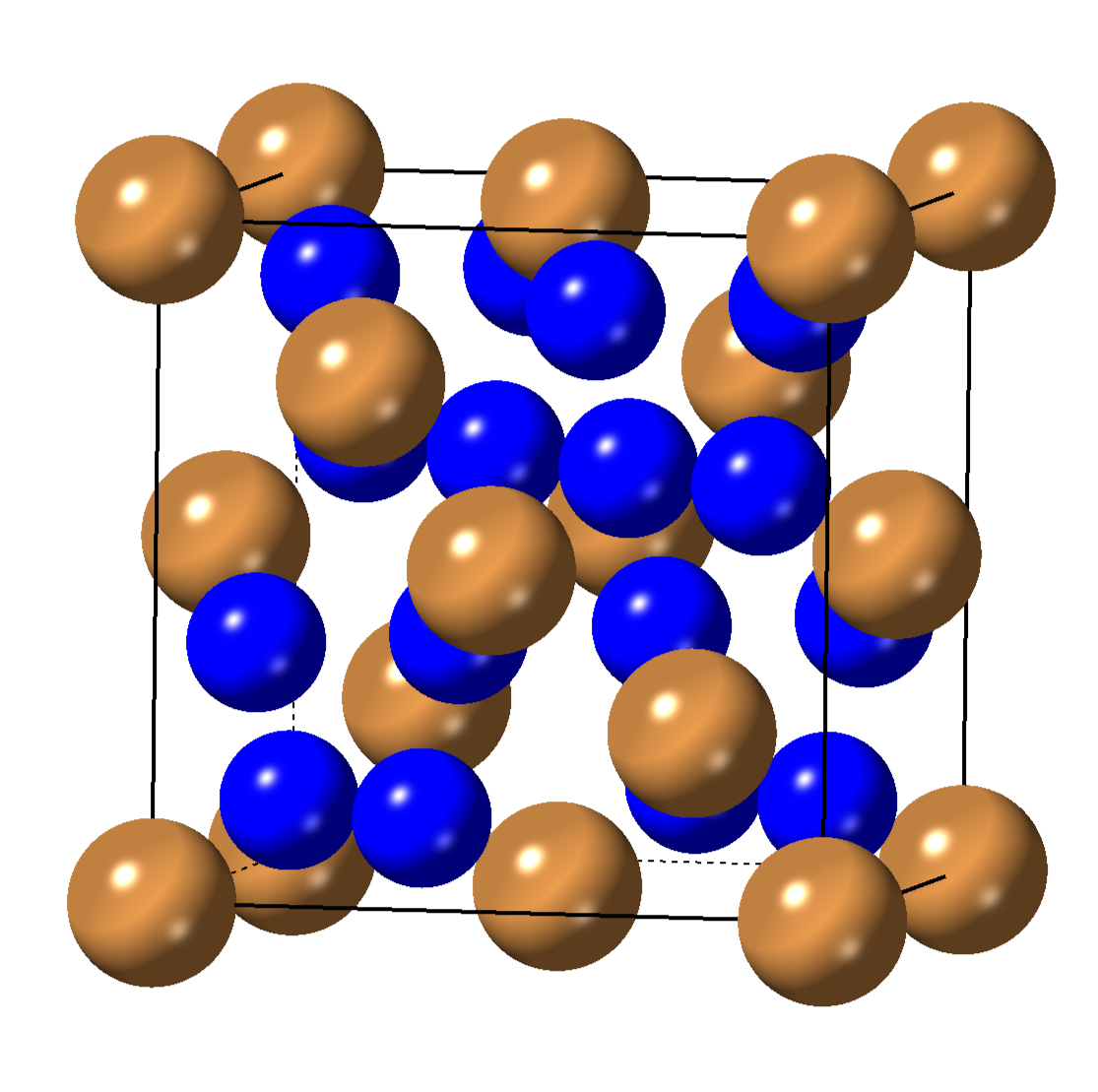
Unit cell of C15 phase with MgCu_{2} structure (Mg atoms are brown).

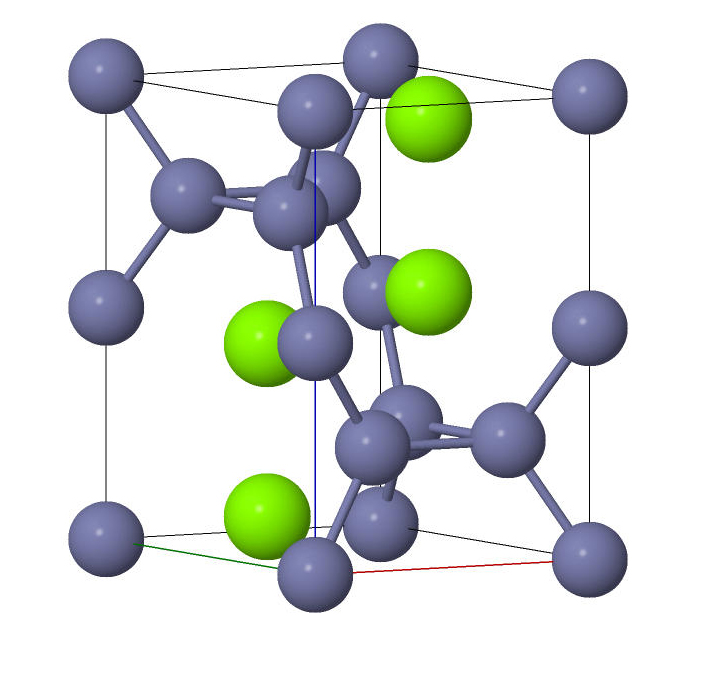
Unit cell of Laves phase with MgZn_{2} structure (Mg atoms are green).

This is the unit cell projection of the hexagonal MgNi_{2} (C36) along the $c$ axis

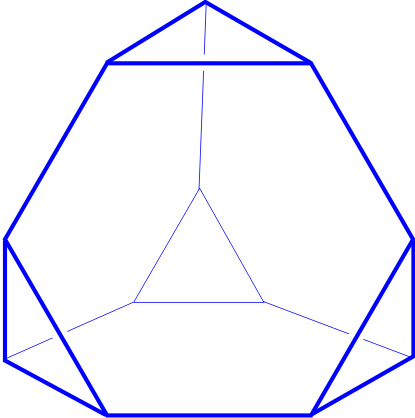
Laves polyhedron

Laves phases are intermetallic phases that have composition AB_{2} and are named for Fritz Laves who first described them. The phases are classified on the basis of geometry alone. While the problem of packing spheres of equal size has been well-studied since Gauss, Laves phases are the result of his investigations into packing spheres of two sizes. Laves phases fall into three Strukturbericht types: cubic MgCu_{2} (C15), hexagonal MgZn_{2} (C14), and hexagonal MgNi_{2} (C36). The latter two classes are unique forms of the hexagonal arrangement, but share the same basic structure. In general, the A atoms are ordered as in diamond, hexagonal diamond, or a related structure, and the B atoms form tetrahedra around the A atoms for the AB_{2} structure.

Laves phases are of particular interest in modern metallurgy research because of their abnormal physical and chemical properties. Many hypothetical or primitive applications have been developed. However, little practical knowledge has been elucidated from Laves phase study so far. A characteristic feature is the almost perfect electrical conductivity, but they are not plastically deformable at room temperature.

In each of the three classes of Laves phase, if the two types of atoms were perfect spheres with a size ratio of √1.5 ≈ 1.225, the structure would be topologically tetrahedrally close-packed. At this size ratio, the structure has an overall packing volume density of 0.710. Compounds found in Laves phases typically have an atomic size ratio between 1.05 and 1.67. Analogues of Laves phases can be formed by the self-assembly of a colloidal dispersion of two sizes of sphere.

Laves phases are instances of the more general Frank–Kasper phases.
