= Intermetallic =

Type of metallic alloy

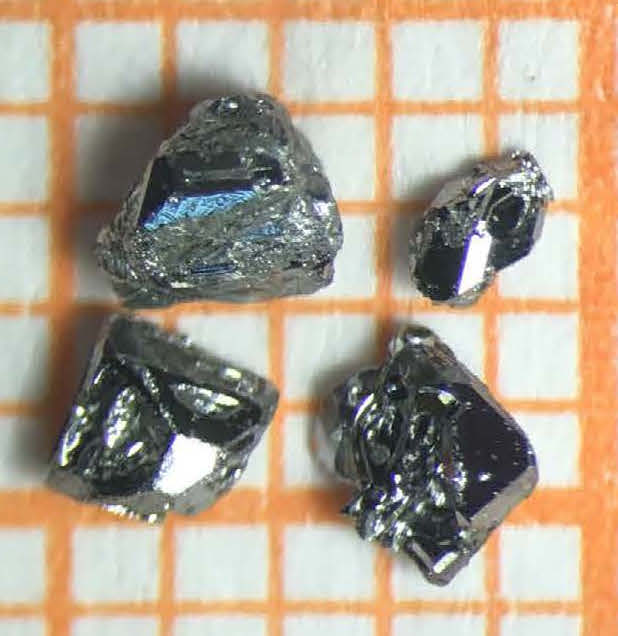
Cr_{11}Ge_{19}

An intermetallic is a type of metallic alloy that forms a solid-state compound with a crystal structure between two or more metallic elements. Alternatively, it can be called intermetallic compound, intermetallic alloy, ordered intermetallic alloy, or long-range-ordered alloy. Intermetallics are generally hard and brittle, with good high-temperature mechanical properties. They can be classified as stoichiometric or nonstoichiometic. A stoichiometric intermetallic has a specific numerical ratio between the metallic elements.

The term "intermetallic compounds" applied to solid phases has long been in use. However, Hume-Rothery argued that it misleads, suggesting a fixed stoichiometry and a clear decomposition into species.

Recent advances in intermetallic crystal chemistry have led to the discovery of a new family of ternary intermetallic compounds known as ZIP phases. These materials exhibit so-called dualistic atomic ordering, in which different atomic sublattices demonstrate distinct ordering mechanisms within a single crystalline framework. ZIP phases can crystallize in both face-centered cubic and hexagonal structural variants, thereby expanding the known structural diversity of complex intermetallic systems.

== Definitions ==
=== Research definition ===
In 1967 Gustav Ernst Robert Schulze defined intermetallic compounds as solid phases containing two or more metallic elements, with optionally one or more non-metallic elements, whose crystal structure differs from that of the other constituents. This definition includes:

- Electron (or Hume-Rothery) compounds
- Size packing phases. e.g., Laves phases, Frank–Kasper phases and Nowotny phases
- Zintl phases

The definition of metal includes:

- Post-transition metals, i.e. aluminium, gallium, indium, thallium, tin, lead, and bismuth.
- Metalloids, e.g., silicon, germanium, arsenic, antimony and tellurium.

Homogeneous and heterogeneous solid solutions of metals, and interstitial compounds such as carbides and nitrides are excluded under this definition. However, interstitial intermetallic compounds are included, as are alloys of intermetallic compounds with a metal.

=== Common use ===
In common use, the research definition, including post-transition metals and metalloids, is extended to include compounds such as cementite, Fe_{3}C. These compounds, sometimes termed interstitial compounds, can be stoichiometric, and share properties with the above intermetallic compounds.

=== Complexes ===
The term intermetallic is used to describe compounds involving two or more metals such as the cyclopentadienyl complex Cp_{6}Ni_{2}Zn_{4}.

=== B2 ===
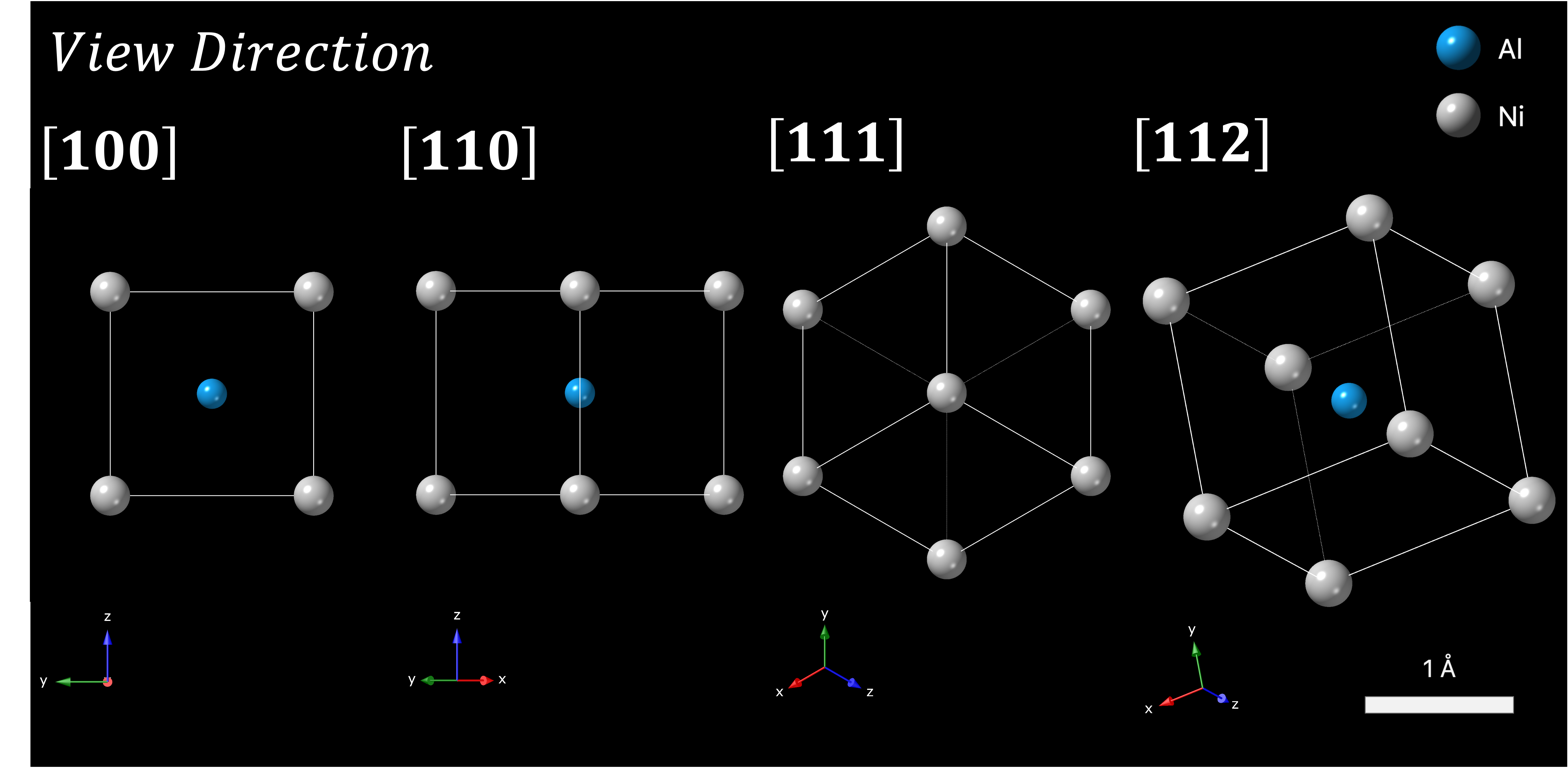
Al-Ni B2 structure (lattice parameter: 2.86 A) viewed from [100], [110], [111], and [112] directions.

A B2 (also known as cesium chloride structure type) intermetallic compound has equal numbers of atoms of two metals, such as aluminium-iron, and aluminium-nickel, arranged as two interpenetrating simple cubic lattices of the component metals.

== Properties ==
Intermetallic compounds are generally brittle at room temperature and have high melting point, though many also exhibit metallic conductivity or semiconducting behavior depending on the degree of covalent bonding. Cleavage or intergranular fracture modes are typical of intermetallics due to limited independent slip systems required for plastic deformation. However, some intermetallics have ductile fracture modes such as Nb–15Al–40Ti. Others can exhibit improved ductility by alloying with other elements to increase grain boundary cohesion. Alloying of other materials such as boron to improve grain boundary cohesion can improve ductility. They may offer a compromise between ceramic and metallic properties when hardness and/or resistance to high temperatures is important enough to sacrifice some toughness and ease of processing. They can display desirable magnetic and chemical properties, due to their strong internal order and mixed (metallic and covalent/ionic) bonding, respectively. Intermetallics have given rise to various novel materials developments.

Physical properties of intermetallics
Intermetallic Compound	Melting Temperature (°C)	Density (kg/m^{3})	Young's Modulus (GPa)
FeAl	1250–1400	5600	263
Ti_{3}Al	1600	4200	210
MoSi_{2}	2020	6310	430

== Applications ==
Examples include alnico and the hydrogen storage materials in nickel metal hydride batteries. Ni_{3}Al, which is the hardening phase in the familiar nickel-base super alloys, and the various titanium aluminides have attracted interest for turbine blade applications, while the latter is also used in small quantities for grain refinement of titanium alloys. Silicides, intermetallics involving silicon, serve as barrier and contact layers in microelectronics. Others include:

- Magnetic materials e.g., alnico, sendust, Permendur, FeCo, Terfenol-D
- Superconductors e.g., A15 phases, niobium-tin
- Hydrogen storage e.g., AB_{5} compounds (nickel metal hydride batteries)
- Shape memory alloys e.g., Cu-Al-Ni (alloys of Cu_{3}Al and nickel), Nitinol (NiTi)
- Coating materials e.g., NiAl
- High-temperature structural materials e.g., nickel aluminide, Ni_{3}Al
- Dental amalgams, which are alloys of intermetallics Ag_{3}Sn and Cu_{3}Sn
- Gate contact/ barrier layer for microelectronics e.g., TiSi_{2}
- Laves phases (AB_{2}), e.g., MgCu_{2}, MgZn_{2} and MgNi_{2}.

The unintended formation of intermetallics can cause problems. For example, intermetallics of gold and aluminium can be a significant cause of wire bond failures in semiconductor devices and other microelectronics devices. The management of intermetallics is a major issue in the reliability of solder joints between electronic components.

== Intermetallic particles ==
Intermetallic particles often form during solidification of metallic alloys, and can be used as a dispersion strengthening mechanism.

== Undesired examples ==
The intermetallic compounds formed by tin are hard and brittle. Some compounds of importance in electronics are Ag_{3}Sn, Cu_{3}Sn, and Cu_{6}Sn_{5}. As these particles grow they tend to compromise the integrity of a solder joint made by lead-free solder. Some additives can reduce the grain size of IMC and disperse them, turning them into strengthing elements.

== History ==
Examples of intermetallics through history include:

- Roman yellow brass, CuZn
- Chinese high tin bronze, Cu_{31}Sn_{8}
- Type metal, SbSn
- Chinese white copper, CuNi

German type metal is described as breaking like glass, without bending, softer than copper, but more fusible than lead.

== See also ==
- Complex metallic alloys
- Kirkendall effect
- Maraging steel
- Metallurgy
- Solid solution
- Strukturbericht designation
- Order and disorder

== Sources ==
- Sauthoff, Gerhard [in German] (1995). Intermetallics. Wiley-VCH. pp. 1–165. ISBN 978-3-527-29320-9.
- Sauthoff, Gerhard [in German] (2006). "Intermetallics". Ullmann's Encyclopedia of Industrial Chemistry. Wiley Interscience. pp. 393–423. doi:10.1002/14356007.e14_e01.pub2. ISBN 978-3-527-30385-4.
