= Magic =

Magic or magick most commonly refers to:

- Magic (supernatural), beliefs and actions employed to influence supernatural beings and forces
  - Ceremonial magic (called magick with a -k suffix by some) or high magic, an organized system developed in the 19th- and 20th-century
  - Magic in fiction, the use of supernatural elements as part of a setting or plot
    - Magic systems in games
      - Magic (game terminology), an attribute in role-playing and video games, often measured in mana points (MP)
- Magic (illusion), also known as stage magic, the art of appearing to perform supernatural feats
- Magical thinking, the belief that unrelated events are causally connected, particularly as a result of supernatural effects

Magic, magić, magics, magick, or magyk, with any capitalization, may also refer to:

== Art and entertainment ==
=== Fictional concepts ===
- Magic in Middle-earth, the usage in J. R. R. Tolkien's fictional realm of Eä
- Magic (Discworld), a force in Terry Pratchett's fictional world
- Magic in Dungeons & Dragons, the system in the role playing game D&D

=== Film ===
- Magic (1917 film), a silent Hungarian drama
- Magic (1978 film), an American horror film directed by Richard Attenborough and starring Anthony Hopkins, Ann-Margret and Burgess Meredith
- Magic, a 1983 Taiwanese film starring Wen Chao-yu
- Magic (2021 film), an Indian Bengali-language psychological action thriller directed by Raja Chanda
- Magic (2024 film), an Indian Marathi-language suspense thriller directed by Ravindra Karmarkar

=== Television ===
- Magic (TV channel), a British music station
- Magic 5, a 2023 Indonesian series
- "Magic" (Not Going Out), S6 E7, 2013
- "Magic", S3 E10 of Bluey, 2021

=== Literature ===
==== Plays ====
- Magic: A Fantastic Comedy, 1913, by G. K. Chesterton
- Magic (Haig play), 2026, by David Haig about Harry Houdini and Sir Arthur Conan Doyle

==== Serials ====
- The Magic Comic, a 1939–1941 British magazine with associated books
- Magic (American magazine), 1991–2016 magazine for magicians
- Magic (music magazine), 1995–2016 French pop music magazine

==== Other literature ====
- Magic (short story collection), 1996, by Isaac Asimov
- Magic (novel), 1976, by William Goldman
- Magick (Book 4), a 1913 book by Aleister Crowley
- Magyk, a 2005 novel by Angie Sage
- The Magic (book), a 2012 self-help book by Rhonda Byrne
- Magic, Inc., a 1940 science fantasy novella by Robert A. Heinlein

=== Music ===
==== Performers ====
- Magic (rapper) (1975–2013), also known as Mr. Magic (real name Awood Johnson), American rapper
- Magic!, Canadian reggae-pop band
- Mel Taylor and the Magics
- The Magic Drum and Bugle Corps, a music group

==== Albums ====
- Magic (Amii Stewart album), 1992
- Magic (Axel Rudi Pell album), 1997
- Magic (Back Number album), 2019
- Magic (B'z album), 2009
- Magic (Ben Rector album), 2018
- Magic (Bruce Springsteen album), 2007
- The Magic (album), Deerhoof, 2016
- Magic (Djumbo album), 2008
- Magic (Dreams Come True album), 1993
- Magic (Exo-CBX album), 2018
- Magic (Four Tops album), 1985
- Magic (Gillan album), 1982
- Magic (Jamule album), 2022
- Magic (The Jets album), 1987
- Magick (album), John Zorn, 2004
- Magic (Jolin Tsai album), 2003
- Magic (Jorma Kaukonen album), 1985
- Magic (Kiri Te Kanawa album), 2005
- Magic (Nas album), 2021
- Magic, Paul Mauriat, 1982
- Magic (Smash Mouth album), 2012
- Magic (Super Junior Special Album Part 2), an edition of Devil (Super Junior album), 2015
- Magic (T-Connection album), 1977
- Magic (T-Square album), 1981
- Magic (Tom Browne album), 1981
- Magic (Twins album), 2004
- The Demis Roussos Magic, 1977

==== Songs ====
Article	Artist	Album	Annum	Annotations
	American alternative rock trio Ben Folds Five	The Unauthorized Biography of Reinhold Messner	1999	drafted as "The Magic That Holds the Sky Up from the Ground"
Magic (B.o.B song)	American hip hop recording artist B.o.B	B.o.B Presents: The Adventures of Bobby Ray	2010	
Magic (Bruce Springsteen song)	American singer-songwriter Bruce Springsteen	Magic	2007	
Magic (The Cars song)	American rock band The Cars	Heartbeat City	1984	
	American singer-songwriter Colbie Caillat	Coco	2007	
Magic (Coldplay song)	British rock band Coldplay	Ghost Stories	2014	
	American pianist/bandleader Count Basie and His Orchestra	April in Paris	1957	
Magic (Craig David song)	English singer Craig David	The Time Is Now	2018	
Magic (What She Do)	New Zealand band DD Smash	The Optimist	1985	titled "Magic (What She Do)"
Magic (Disco Montego song)	Australian dance music duo Disco Montego	Disco Montego	2002	feat. Katie Underwood
Magic (Dragon song)	New Zealand-Australian rock band Dragon	Body and the Beat	1984	
Magic (Future song)	American rapper Future	Pluto	2012	
Magic (Gabrielle Aplin song)	English singer-songwriter Gabrielle Aplin	Dear Happy	2020	
Magic (Ill Blu song)	British record production duo Ill Blu	The BLUPRINT	2020	feat. OFB, Bandokay & Double Lz
Magic (Jolin Tsai song)	Taiwanese singer Jolin Tsai	Magic	2003	
	Just For Laughs		2021	opening theme to the television special Scooby-Doo, Where Are You Now!
	South Korean girl group Kara	Revolution	2009	Korean: 마법
Magic (Kelly Clarkson song)	American singer Kelly Clarkson	Chemistry	2023	
Magick (Klaxons song)	London band Klaxons	Myths of the Near Future	2007	titled "Magick"
Magic (Kylie Minogue song)	Australian singer Kylie Minogue	Disco	2020	
Magic (Ladyhawke song)	New Zealand recording artist Ladyhawke	Ladyhawke	2008	
Magic (The Linda Lindas song)	American rock band the Linda Lindas	Growing Up	2022	
Magic (Marshmello and Jauz song)	American music producers and DJs Marshmello and Jauz	[non-album single]	2016	
	Mick Smiley	soundtrack to the film Ghostbusters	1984	
Magic (Mrs. Green Apple song)	Japanese rock band Mrs. Green Apple	Antenna	2023	
Magic (Mystery Skulls song)	American musician Luis Dubuc	Forever	2014	
Magic (Nelly Furtado song)	Canadian singer-songwriter Nelly Furtado	The Ride	2017	
Magic (New Kids on the Block song)	American boy band New Kids on the Block	Still Kids	2024	
Magic (Nick Drake song)	English musician Nick Drake	Made to Love Magic	2004	AKA "I Was Made to Love Magic"; recorded 1969
Magic (O'G3NE song)	Dutch group O'G3NE	We Got This (Special Edition)	2014	
Magic (One Direction song)	English-Irish boy band One Direction	Take Me Home	2012	
Magic (Olivia Newton-John song)	British-Australian singer Olivia Newton-John	soundtrack to the film Xanadu	1980	
Magic (Paul McCartney song)	English musician Paul McCartney	Driving Rain	2001	
Magic (Pilot song)	Scottish pop rock band Pilot	From the Album of the Same Name	1974	later covered by Selena Gomez
	American girl group the Pussycat Dolls	Doll Domination	2008	
Magic (Rainbow song)	British hard rock band Rainbow	Difficult to Cure	1981	
	American singer-songwriter Raveena	Asha's Awakening	2022	
Magic (Rina Aiuchi song)	Japanese singer-songwriter Rina Aiuchi	All Singles Best: Thanx 10th Anniversary	2009	
Magic (Ringo Starr song)	English singer-songwriter Ringo Starr	What's My Name	2019	
Magic (Robin Thicke song)	American R&B singer Robin Thicke	Something Else	2008	
	American rock/country singer-songwriter Ryan Adams and The Cardinals	Cardinology	2008	titled "Magick"
Magic (Sasha song)	Welsh DJ Sasha	The Qat Collection	1994	
Magic (Sean Smith song)	British singer Sean Smith		2017	
Magic (Secret song)	South Korean girl group Secret	Secret Time EP	2010	
Magic (Sia song)	Australian singer and songwriter Sia	A Wrinkle in Time (Original Motion Picture Soundtrack)	2018	
	American rock band Smash Mouth	Magic	2012	
Magic (Sophie Ellis-Bextor song)	English singer and songwriter Sophie Ellis-Bextor	Make a Scene	2011	
Magic (The Sound of Arrows song)	Swedish duo The Sound of Arrows	Voyage	2011	
	British rock band Status Quo	Ain't Complaining	1988	
	American R&B/soul singer Stephanie Mills	Stephanie	1981	
Magic (Super Junior song)	South Korean boy band Super Junior	Magic	2015	
Magic (Tomorrow X Together song)	South Korean boy band Tomorrow X Together	The Chaos Chapter: Freeze	2021	
Magic (Tweet song)	American singer Tweet	Charlene	2016	
Magic (Vince Staples and Mustard song)	American rapper Vince Staples	Ramona Park Broke My Heart	2022	feat. Mustard
Magic (Westlife song)	Irish pop vocal band Westlife	Wild Dreams	2021	
Magic (Yung Gravy song)	Swiss-American rapper Yung Gravy	Sensational	2019	
	South Korean rapper Zior Park	Where Does Sasquatch Live? Part 1	2023	titled "Magic!"

=== Games ===
- Magic: The Gathering, a trading card game
- Magic (NightLife), a 1990 supplement for the role-playing game Nightlife
- Magic (DC Heroes), a 1992 supplement for the role-playing game DC Heroes

=== Other uses in art and entertainment ===
- Magic (trade show), an annual apparel show

== Sports ==
=== Sports people ===
- Magic Johnson (born 1959), American basketball player and businessman
- Rajko Magić (born 1955), Croatian football manager and former player
- Dragutin Magić, a 1991 winner of the Franjo Bučar State Award for Sport

=== Sports teams ===
- Egoli Magic, a South African basketball team
- Orlando Magic, a National Basketball Association (NBA) team
- Osceola Magic, an NBA G League basketball team
- Waikato Bay of Plenty Magic, a New Zealand netball team

== Businesses and organizations not mentioned elsewhere ==
- Multi-Agency Geographic Information for the Countryside (MAGIC), a UK mapping service
- Magic, Inc. (magic goods company), a magic book publisher and product retailer
- Magic, Inc. (think tank), an educational think tank
- Malaysian Global Innovation and Creativity Centre (MaGIC), an organisation based in Cyberjaya, Malaysia

== Radio stations ==
=== Canada ===
- CJMJ-FM (Magic 100.3), Ottawa, Ontario
- CJMK-FM (Magic 98.3), Saskatoon, Saskatchewan
- CJUK-FM (Magic 99.9), Thunder Bay, Ontario

=== United States ===
- KBOI-FM (Magic 93.1), Boise, Idaho, formerly KZMG
- KKMG (98.9 Magic FM), Colorado Springs, Colorado
- KMGA (99.5 Magic FM), Albuquerque, New Mexico
- KMGL (Magic 104.1), Oklahoma City, Oklahoma
- KNEV (Magic 95.5), Reno, Nevada
- KYMG (Magic 98.9), Anchorage, Alaska
- WDYK (Magic 100.5), Cumberland, Maryland
- WLMG (Magic 101.9), New Orleans, Louisiana
- WLTB (Magic 101.7), Binghamton, New York
- WMAG (Magic 99.5), Greensboro, North Carolina, former branding
- WMGC-FM (Magic 105.1), Detroit, Michigan, former branding
- WMGF (Magic 107.7), Orlando, Florida
- WMGN (Magic 98.1), Madison, Wisconsin
- WMGQ (Magic 98.3), New Brunswick, New Jersey
- WMGS (Magic 93), Wilkes-Barre, Pennsylvania
- WMJJ (Magic 96.5), Birmingham, Alabama
- WMJM (Magic 101.3), Louisville, Kentucky
- WMJX (Magic 106.7), Boston, Massachusetts
- WMXJ (Magic 102.7), Miami, Florida, formerly known as "Majic 102.7", and now known as "102.7 The Beach"
- WROW (Magic 590), Albany, New York
- WSPA-FM (Magic 98.9), Spartanburg, South Carolina

=== Elsewhere ===
- Magic Nationwide, a radio network in the Philippines
  - DWTM (Magic 89.9), Manila
  - DXEL (Magic 95.5), Zamboanga City
  - DXKB (Magic 89.3), Cagayan de Oro
  - DXKM (General Santos) (Magic 106.3), General Santos
  - DYBE-FM (Magic 106.3), Bacolod
  - DYBN (Magic 92.3), Cebu
- Magic 1278 (3EE), Melbourne, Australia
- Magic FM Aba, Nigeria
- Magic Malta (91.7 FM), a Maltese radio station
- Magic (UK radio station), a radio station based in London and broadcast across the UK
- Magic (English former radio network), a former radio network in the UK
- Magic (New Zealand radio network), a radio network in New Zealand

== Technology ==
=== Computing ===
==== Computer science ====
- Magic (programming), complex code behind a simple interface
- Magic (quantum information), a property in quantum information theory

==== Programs etc. ====
- Magic (software), a layout tool
- ImageMagick, image manipulation software
- MagiC, an Atari ST operating system
- MAGIC, a programming language by Meditech

==== Hardware devices ====
- HTC Magic, a mobile phone

==== Other uses in computing ====
- Magic Software Enterprises, a software company
- Gibson MaGIC (Media-accelerated Global Information Carrier), a network audio protocol
- Multi Autonomous Ground-robotic International Challenge (MAGIC), a robotics competition

=== Other technology ===
- R.550 Magic, a missile
- Magnesium injection cycle (MAGIC), an engine design
- Magic (cryptography), a World War II cryptanalysis project
- MAGIC (telescope) (Major Atmospheric Gamma Imaging Cherenkov Telescopes, later renamed to MAGIC Florian Goebel Telescopes), Roque de los Muchachos Observatory, La Palma, Canary Islands

== Transportation ==
=== Automobile ===
- Tata Magic, an Indian microvan
- Tata Magic Iris, an Indian microvan

=== Aviation ===
- Airwave Magic, an Austrian paraglider design
- DTA Magic, a French ultralight trike wing
- Eurodisplay SR-01 Magic, a Czech ultralight aircraft
- Ibis GS-700 Magic, a Colombian aircraft design
- Ibis GS-710 Magic, a Colombian aircraft design
- Ibis GS-730 Super Magic, a Colombian aircraft design
- Ibis GS-750 Grand Magic, a Colombian aircraft design
- Sunair Magic, a German ultralight trike design

=== Maritime ===
- HMS Magic, several Royal Navy ships
- Carnival Magic, a cruise ship operating 2011–present
- Disney Magic, a cruise ship operating 1998–present
- Magic (log canoe), a Chesapeake Bay racing canoe
- Magic (yacht), a racing schooner yacht, 1857–1922

== Other uses ==
- Magic (coffee), a drink made with steamed milk and a double ristretto, associated with Melbourne, Australia
- Sphen and Magic, male gentoo penguins at the Sea Life Sydney Aquarium
- Magić Mala, a settlement in Nova Kapela, Brod-Posavina County, Croatia
- Animal perception of magic

== See also ==
- WP:MAGIC
- Category:Magic (disambiguation)

=== Derived words and alternate spellings ===
- Magica (disambiguation)
- Magical (disambiguation)
- Magician (disambiguation)
- Magik (disambiguation)
- Magique (disambiguation)
- Majic (disambiguation), including "Majc"
- Majik (disambiguation)
- Magico (disambiguation)
- Magix, subsidiary of the BELLEVUE Investments GmbH & Co. KGaA investment group
