= Ibis GS-730 Super Magic =

Colombian STOL homebuilt aircraft

GS-730 Super Magic

General information
- Type: Homebuilt aircraft
- National origin: Colombia
- Manufacturer: Ibis Aircraft
- Status: Production completed

History
- Developed from: Ibis GS-700 Magic

The Ibis GS-730 Super Magic is a Colombian STOL homebuilt aircraft that was designed and produced by Ibis Aircraft of Cali, introduced in 2007. When it was available the aircraft was supplied as a complete ready-to-fly-aircraft or as a kit for amateur construction.

Production has been completed and as of 2011 the aircraft was no longer part of the company's product line.

== Design and development ==
The GS-730 Super Magic is a development of the lighter Ibis GS-700 Magic and features a cantilever high-wing with a Robertson STOL kit, a two-seats-in-side-by-side configuration enclosed cabin with doors, fixed tricycle landing gear with wheel pants and a single engine in tractor configuration.

The GS-730 Super Magic is made from sheet aluminium "all-metal" construction, with the wing tips and cowling made from composite material. Its 8.92 m (29.3 ft) span wing employs a NACA 650-18m airfoil, mounts flaps and has a wing area of 12.4 m^{2} (133 sq ft). The main landing gear is strengthened and made from 7075-T6 aluminium, while the nose gear has lever suspension using rubber pucks and helical springs. The main wheels include hydraulic disc brakes. Fuel tank capacity is 55 kg (121 lb) or optionally 82 kg (181 lb) or optionally a maximum of 104 kg (229 lb).

The aircraft has a typical empty weight of 320 kg (710 lb) and a gross weight of 569 kg (1,254 lb), giving a useful load of 249 kg (549 lb). With maximum full fuel of 104 kg (229 lb) the payload for pilot, passenger and baggage is 145 kg (320 lb).

The standard day, sea level, no wind, take off is 80 m (262 ft) and the landing roll is 100 m (328 ft).

== Specifications (GS-730 Super Magic) ==
Data from Jane's All The World's Aircraft 2012-2013

General characteristics

- Crew: one
- Capacity: one passenger
- Length: 6.83 m (22 ft 5 in)
- Wingspan: 8.92 m (29 ft 3 in)
- Height: 2.16 m (7 ft 1 in)
- Wing area: 12.4 m^{2} (133 sq ft)
- Aspect ratio: 3.77:1
- Empty weight: 320 kg (705 lb)
- Gross weight: 569 kg (1,254 lb)
- Fuel capacity: 55 kg (121 lb) or optionally 82 kg (181 lb) or 104 kg (229 lb)
- Powerplant: 1 × Rotax 912 ULS four cylinder, air and liquid-cooled, four stroke aircraft engine, 75 kW (100 hp)
- Propellers: 3-bladed Ivoprop

Performance

- Cruise speed: 185 km/h (115 mph, 100 kn)
- Never exceed speed: 209 km/h (130 mph, 113 kn)
- Range: 563 km (350 mi, 304 nmi) , 1,044 km (649 mi) with maximum fuel
- Endurance: 3:30 or 5:30 with maximum fuel
- Service ceiling: 3,660 m (12,010 ft)
- g limits: +/-3
- Rate of climb: 5.08 m/s (1,000 ft/min)
- Wing loading: 45.89 kg/m^{2} (9.40 lb/sq ft)
