= Majic =

Majic may refer to:

== People and characters ==
- Majić and Majic, a South Slavic matronymic surname; and list of people with that name
- Majic Massey, U.S. singer
- Dan "Majic" Maciejczak, coach of the indoor football team Wyoming Cavalry in Caspar, Wyoming, USA
- Majic, a fictional character from Sorcerous Stabber Orphen

== Radio stations ==
- Majic 88.7, DWLD, Batangas City, Batangas Province, Luzon Island, Philippines
- Majic 92.7, WDCJ, Prince Frederick, Maryland, USA
- Majic 93.1, WZMJ, Batesburg, South Carolina, USA
- Majic 94.1, WTHZ, Lexington, North Carolina, USA; former name of WWLV
- Majic 94.5, KZMJ, Gainesville, Texas, USA
- Majic 95.1, WAJI, Fort Wayne, Indiana, USA
- Majic 95.5, KKMJ-FM, Austin, Texas, USA
- Majic 95.9, WYNT, Marion, Ohio, USA
- Majic 95.9, WWIN-FM, Glen Burnie, Maryland, USA
- Majic 97, KJMG, Bastrop, Louisiana, USA
- Majic 97.5, WUMJ, Fayetteville, Georgia, USA
- Majic 99.9, WLXN, Lexington, North Carolina, USA
- Majic 100, CJMJ-FM, Ottawa, Ontario, Canada
- Majic 100, KIMN, Denver, Colorado, USA
- Majic 100, WQMJ, Forsyth, Georgia, USA
- Majic FM 100, KMJJ-FM, Shreveport, Louisiana, USA
- Majic 100.3, KATZ-FM, Bridgeton, Missouri, USA
- Majic 102.1, KMJQ, Houston, Texas, USA
- Majic 102.3, WMMJ, Washington, District of Columbia, USA
- Majic 102.5, KTCX, Beaumont, Texas, USA
- Majic 102.7, WMXJ, Pompano Beach, Florida, USA; former name (1986–2012), later "Magic 102.7", and now "102.7 The Beach"
- Majic 103.7, W279AQ, Mascoutah, Illinois, USA
- Majic 104.9, KTLK-FM, Columbia, Illinois, USA
- Majic 104.9, KMIQ, Robstown, Texas, USA
- Majic 105, WMJV, Patterson, State of New York, USA; former name of WDBY
- Majic 105, KSLZ, St. Louis, Missouri, USA
- Majic 105.7, WMJI, Cleveland, Ohio, USA
- Majic 106.1, CIMJ-FM, Guelph, Ontario, Canada
- Majic 107, WKXI-FM, Magee, Mississippi, USA
- Majic 107.1, WHJB, Greensburg, Pennsylvania, USA
- Majic 107.5, WAMJ, Roswell, Georgia, USA
- Majic 107.5, WPZE, Mableton, Georgia, USA
- Majic 107.5, WMJW, Cleveland, Mississippi, USA
- Majic 107.7, KMAJ-FM, Carbondale, Topeka metro area, Kansas, USA
- Majic 810, WMJH, Rockford, Michigan, USA
- Majic 1280, WODT, New Orleans, Louisiana, USA
- Majik, WMJK, Clyde, Ohio, USA

== Groups, organizations ==
- Majic 12 (MJ-12), a.k.a. Majestic-12, a supposed U.S. UFO investigation organization, popular in UFOlogy and with conspiracy theorists
- Chattanooga Majic, Chattanooga, Tennessee, USA; a professional basketball team in the World Basketball Association
- Mothers Against Jesse in Congress (MAJIC), a political action committee established by Eloise Freeland Maddry Vaugn, wife of Earl W. Vaughn

== Other uses ==
- "Majic" (song), a 2009 single by Joe off the album Signature; see Joe discography

== See also ==
- Magic (disambiguation)
- Magik (disambiguation)
- Magiq (disambiguation)
- Magique (disambiguation)
- Majik (disambiguation)
- Majc:
  - Microprocessor Architecture for Java Computing (MAJC), a design for a computer CPU
  - Miha Majc, a Slovenian Nation candidate in the 2014 European Parliament election in Slovenia
  - Biserka Majc, the Party of Slovene People (SSN) candidate in districts 1 and 2 of the Ljubljana-Bežigrad constituency in the list of candidates in the 2018 Slovenian parliamentary election
  - Colum (Dove) BAe Jetstream 41 (Reg. Num.: G-MAJC), listed in British Airways ethnic liveries § World tail liveries
