= Ibis GS-600 Arrow =

Colombian homebuilt aircraft

GS-600 Arrow

General information
- Type: Homebuilt aircraft
- National origin: Colombia
- Manufacturer: Ibis Aircraft
- Status: Production completed

History
- Introduction date: 2000
- Variant: Ibis GS-501 Urraco

The GS-600 Arrow is a Colombian homebuilt aircraft that was designed and produced by Ibis Aircraft of Cali, introduced in 2000. When the aircraft was available it was supplied as a complete ready-to-fly-aircraft or as a kit for amateur construction.

Production has been completed and as of 2011 the aircraft was no longer part of the company's product line.

== Design and development ==
The GS-600 Arrow features a strut-braced high-wing, a two-seats-in-side-by-side configuration enclosed cabin with vertically-hinged doors, fixed tricycle landing gear with wheel pants and a single engine in tractor configuration.

The aircraft is made from sheet aluminium "all-metal" construction, with the wing tips and cowling made from composite material. Its 9.20 m (30.2 ft) span wing employs a NACA 650-18m airfoil, mounts flaps and has a wing area of 12.97 m^{2} (139.6 sq ft). The wing is supported by V-struts and jury struts. The main landing gear is sprung 7075-T6 aluminium, while the nose gear has lever suspension using rubber pucks and helical springs. The main wheels include hydraulic disc brakes.

The standard engine fitted is the 75 kW (101 hp) Rotax 912ULS, driving a three-bladed Ivoprop propeller.

The aircraft has a typical empty weight of 340 kg (750 lb) and a gross weight of 600 kg (1,300 lb), giving a useful load of 260 kg (570 lb). With full fuel of 55 kg (121 lb) the payload for pilot, passenger and baggage is 205 kg (452 lb).

== Specifications (GS-600 Arrow) ==
Data from Jane's All The World's Aircraft 2012-2013

General characteristics

- Crew: one
- Capacity: one passenger
- Length: 6.37 m (20 ft 11 in)
- Wingspan: 9.20 m (30 ft 2 in)
- Height: 2.51 m (8 ft 3 in)
- Wing area: 12.97 m^{2} (139.6 sq ft)
- Empty weight: 340 kg (750 lb)
- Gross weight: 600 kg (1,323 lb)
- Fuel capacity: 76 litres (17 imp gal; 20 US gal)
- Powerplant: 1 × Rotax 912 ULS four cylinder, air and liquid-cooled, four stroke aircraft engine, 75 kW (100 hp)
- Propellers: 3-bladed Ivoprop

Performance

- Maximum speed: 185 km/h (115 mph, 100 kn)
- Cruise speed: 178 km/h (111 mph, 96 kn)
- Stall speed: 65 km/h (40 mph, 35 kn) flaps down
- Never exceed speed: 209 km/h (130 mph, 113 kn)
- Range: 563 km (350 mi, 304 nmi)
- Endurance: 3:30
- Service ceiling: 3,660 m (12,010 ft)
- g limits: +6/-3
- Rate of climb: 4.6 m/s (910 ft/min)
- Wing loading: 46.3 kg/m^{2} (9.5 lb/sq ft)
- Power/mass: 8.16 kg/kW
