= Theory of mind in animals =

Philosophical and psychological concept

Theory of mind in animals is an extension to non-human animals of the philosophical and psychological concept of theory of mind (ToM), sometimes known as mentalisation or mind-reading. It involves an inquiry into whether non-human animals have the ability to attribute mental states (such as intention, desires, pretending, knowledge) to themselves and others, including recognition that others have mental states that are different from their own. To investigate this issue experimentally, researchers place non-human animals in situations where their resulting behavior can be interpreted as supporting ToM or not.

The existence of theory of mind in non-human animals is controversial. On the one hand, one hypothesis proposes that some non-human animals have complex cognitive processes which allow them to attribute mental states to other individuals, sometimes called "mind-reading" while another proposes that non-human animals lack these skills and depend on more simple learning processes such as associative learning; or in other words, they are simply behaviour-reading.

Several studies have been designed specifically to test whether non-human animals possess theory of mind by using interspecific or intraspecific communication. Several taxa have been tested including primates, birds and canines. Positive results have been found; however, these are often qualified as showing only low-grade ToM, or rejected as not convincing by other researchers.

== History and development ==
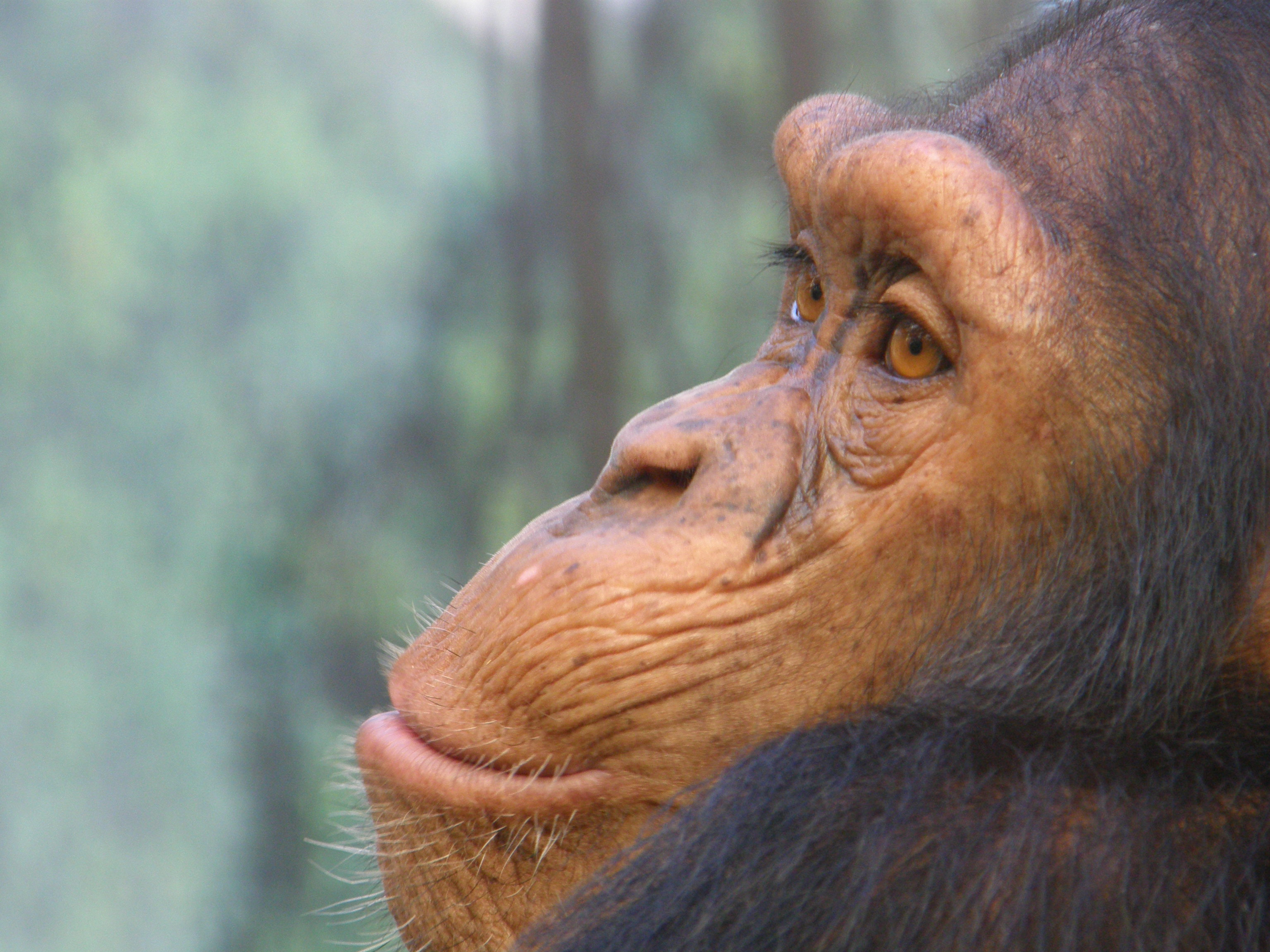
Much of the early work on ToM in animals focused on the understanding chimpanzees have of human knowledge

The term "theory of mind" was originally proposed by Premack and Woodruff in 1978. Early studies focused almost entirely on studying if chimpanzees could understand the knowledge of humans. This approach turned out not to be particularly fruitful and 20 years later, Heyes, reviewing all the extant data, observed that there had been "no substantial progress" in the subject area.

A 2000 paper approached the issue differently by examining competitive foraging behaviour between primates of the same species (conspecifics). This led to the rather limited conclusion that "chimpanzees know what conspecifics do and do not see".

In 2007, Penn and Povinelli wrote "there is still little consensus on whether or not nonhuman animals understand anything about unobservable mental states or even what it would mean for a non-verbal animal to understand the concept of a 'mental state'." They went on further to suggest that ToM was "any cognitive system, whether theory-like or not, that predicts or explains the behaviour of another agent by postulating that unobservable inner states particular to the cognitive perspective of that agent causally modulate that agent's behaviour".

In 2010, an article in Scientific American acknowledged that dogs are considerably better at using social direction cues (e.g. pointing by humans) than are chimpanzees. In the same year, Towner wrote, "the issue may have evolved beyond whether or not there is theory of mind in non-human primates to a more sophisticated appreciation that the concept of mind has many facets and some of these may exist in non-human primates while others may not." Horowitz, working with dogs, agreed.

In 2013, Whiten reviewed the literature and concluded that regarding the question "Are chimpanzees truly mentalists, like we are?", he stated he could not offer an affirmative or negative answer. A similarly equivocal view was stated in 2014 by Brauer, who suggested that many previous experiments on ToM could be explained by the animals possessing other abilities. They went on further to make reference to several authors who suggest it is pointless to ask a "yes or no" question, rather, it makes more sense to ask which psychological states animals understand and to what extent. At the same time, it was suggested that a "minimal theory of mind" may be "what enables those with limited cognitive resources or little conceptual sophistication, such as infants, chimpanzees, scrub-jays and human adults under load, to track others' perceptions, knowledge states and beliefs."

In 2015, Cecilia Heyes, Professor of Psychology at the University of Oxford, wrote about research on ToM, "Since that time [2000], many enthusiasts have become sceptics, empirical methods have become more limited, and it is no longer clear what research on animal mindreading is trying to find" and "However, after some 35 years of research on mindreading in animals, there is still nothing resembling a consensus about whether any animal can ascribe any mental state" (Heyes' emphasis). Heyes further suggested that "In combination with the use of inanimate control stimuli, species that are unlikely to be capable of mindreading, and the 'goggles method' [see below], these approaches could restore both vigour and rigour to research on animal mindreading."

== Methods ==
Specific categories of behaviour are sometimes used as evidence of animal ToM, including imitation, self-recognition, social relationships, deception, role-taking (empathy), perspective-taking, teaching and co-operation, however, this approach has been criticised. Some researchers focus on animals' understanding of intention, gaze, perspective, or knowledge, i.e. what another being has seen. Several experimental methods have been developed which are widely used or suggested as appropriate tests for nonhuman animals possessing ToM. Some studies look at communication between individuals of the same species (intraspecific) whereas others investigate behaviour between individuals of different species (interspecific).

=== Knower-Guesser ===
The Knower-Guesser method has been used in many studies relating to animal ToM.

=== Competitive feeding paradigm ===
The competitive feeding paradigm approach is considered by some as evidence that animals have some understanding of the relationship between "seeing" and "knowing".

=== Goggles Method ===
In one suggested protocol, chimpanzees are given first-hand experience of wearing two mirrored visors. One of the visors is transparent whereas the other is not. The visors themselves are of markedly different colours or shapes. During the subsequent test session, the chimpanzees are given the opportunity to use their species-typical begging behaviour to request food from one of the two humans, one wearing the transparent visor and the other wearing the opaque. If chimpanzees possess ToM, it would be expected they would beg more often from the human wearing the transparent visor.

=== False Belief Test ===
A method used to test ToM in human children has been adapted for testing non-human animals. The basis of the test is to track the gaze of the animal. One human hides an object in view of a second human who then leaves the room. The object is then removed.

== In nonhuman primates ==
Many ToM studies have used nonhuman primates (NHPs). One study that examined the understanding of intention in orangutans (Pongo pygmaeus), chimpanzees (Pan troglodytes) and children showed that all three species understood the difference between accidental and intentional acts.

=== Chimpanzees ===
There is controversy over the interpretation of evidence purporting to show ToM in chimpanzees.

==== Attribution of perception ====
Chimpanzees were unable to follow a human's gaze to find food hidden under opaque bowls, but were able to do so when food was hidden in tubes that the experimenter was able to look into. This seems to suggest that chimpanzees can infer another individual's perception depending on the clarity of the mechanism through which the individual has gained that knowledge.

Attempts to use the "Goggles Method" (see above) on highly human-enculturated chimpanzees failed to demonstrate they possess ToM.

In contrast, chimpanzees use the gaze of other chimpanzees to gain information about whether food is accessible. Subordinate chimpanzees are able to use the knowledge state of dominant chimpanzees to determine which container has hidden food.

==== Attribution of intentions ====
Young chimpanzees were shown to reliably help researchers perform tasks that involved reaching (such as picking up dropped items that the researcher struggled to retrieve), without specific prompting. This suggests that these chimpanzees were able to understand the researcher's intentions in these cases and acted upon them.

In a similar study, chimps were provided with a preference box with two compartments, one containing a picture of food, the other containing a picture of nothing. Neither were actually related to the contents of the box. In a foraging competition game, chimpanzees avoided the chamber with the picture of food when their competitor had chosen one of the chambers before them.

Captive bonobos such as Kanzi have been reported to show concern for their handlers' well-being. Bonobos also console other bonobos who are victims of aggressive conflicts and reconcile after participating in these conflicts. Both of these behaviors suggest some semblance of ToM through an attribution of mental states to another individual.

==== Attribution of False Belief ====
Chimpanzees have passed the False Belief Test (see above) involving anticipating the gaze of humans when objects have been removed. Infrared eye-tracking showed that the chimpanzee subjects' gaze were focused on where the experimenter would falsely believe the object /subject to be, rather than focusing on its actual location of which the chimps were aware. This seems to suggest that the chimpanzees were capable of ascribing false belief to the experimenter.

Evidence for ToM	Present in Chimps?	Present in Bonobos?	References
Attribution to Perception/Knowledge
Using human gaze to find food hidden under opaque bowl	No		Call et al., 1998
Using human gaze to find food hidden in tube open to human	Yes		Call et al., 1998
Remembering what human had seen and inferring target of attention	Yes	Yes	MacLean & Hare, 2012
Attribution to Intention
Helping humans retrieve objects when reaching	Yes		Warneken & Tomasello, 2008
Consoling victims of conflict and reconciling after participating in these conflicts		Yes	Clay & Waal, 2013
Attribution of False Belief
Anticipating that human will look in wrong location based on false belief	Yes	Yes	Krupenye et al., 2016

=== Other primates ===
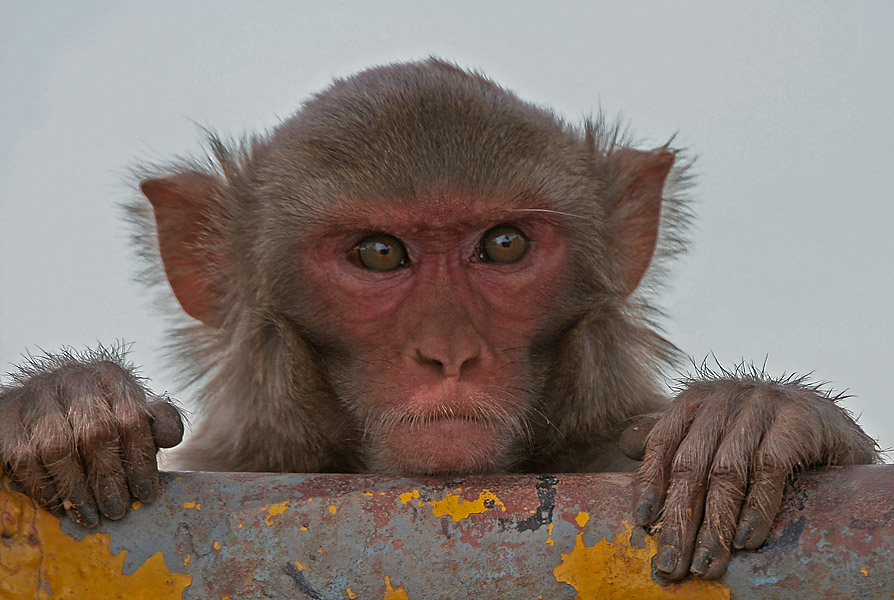
Rhesus macaques selectively steal grapes from humans who are incapable of seeing the grape compared to humans who can see the grape.

In one approach testing monkeys, rhesus macaques (Macaca mulatta) are able to "steal" a contested grape from one of two human competitors. In six experiments, the macaques selectively stole the grape from a human who was incapable of seeing the grape, rather than from the human who was visually aware. Similarly, free ranging rhesus macaques preferentially choose to steal food items from locations where they can be less easily observed by humans, or where they will make less noise.

The authors also reported that at least one individual of each of the species showed (weak) evidence of ToM.

In a multi-species study, it was shown that chimpanzees, bonobos and orangutans passed the False Belief Test (see above).

In 2009, a summary of the ToM research, particularly emphasising an extensive comparison of humans, chimpanzees and orang-utans, concluded that great apes do not exhibit understanding of human referential intentions expressed in communicative gestures, such as pointing.

== In birds ==
=== Parrots ===
Grey parrots (Psittacus erithacus) have demonstrated high levels of intelligence. Irene Pepperberg did experiments with these and her most accomplished parrot, Alex, demonstrated behaviour which seemed to manipulate the trainer, possibly indicating theory of mind.

=== Ravens ===
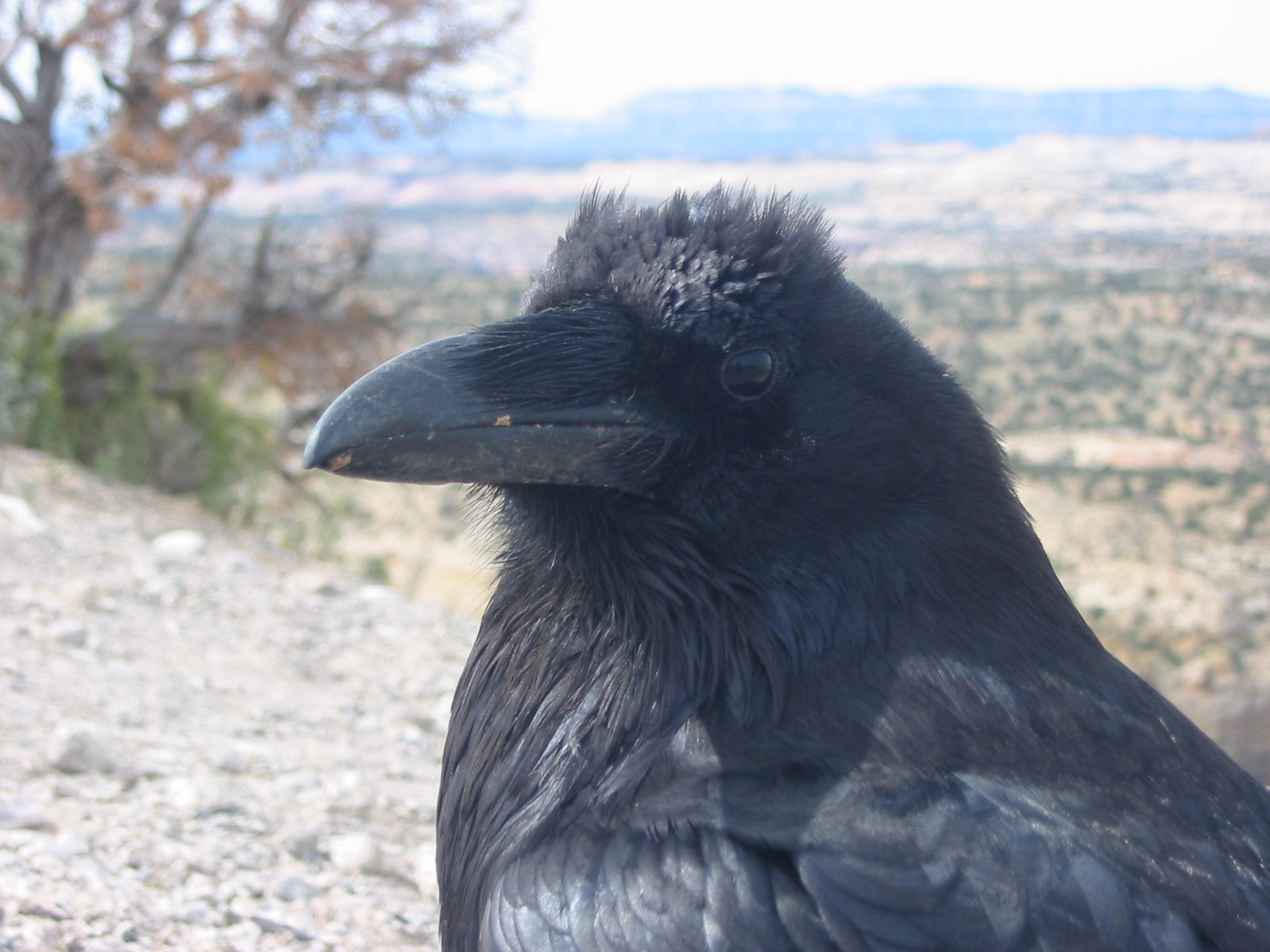
Ravens adjust their caching behaviour according to whether they have been watched and who was watching them.

Ravens are members of the family Corvidae and are widely regarded as having complex cognitive abilities. Other studies indicate that ravens recall who was watching them during caching, but also know the effects of visual barriers on what competitors can and can not see, and how this affects their pilfering.

Ravens have been tested for their understanding of "seeing" as a mental state in other ravens. The researchers further suggested that their findings could be considered in terms of the "minimal" (as opposed to "full-blown") ToM recently suggested.

Using the Knower-Guesser approach, ravens observing a human hiding food are capable of predicting the behaviour of bystander ravens that had been visible at both, none or just one of two baiting events. The visual field of the competitors was manipulated independently of the view of the test-raven.

=== Scrub jays ===
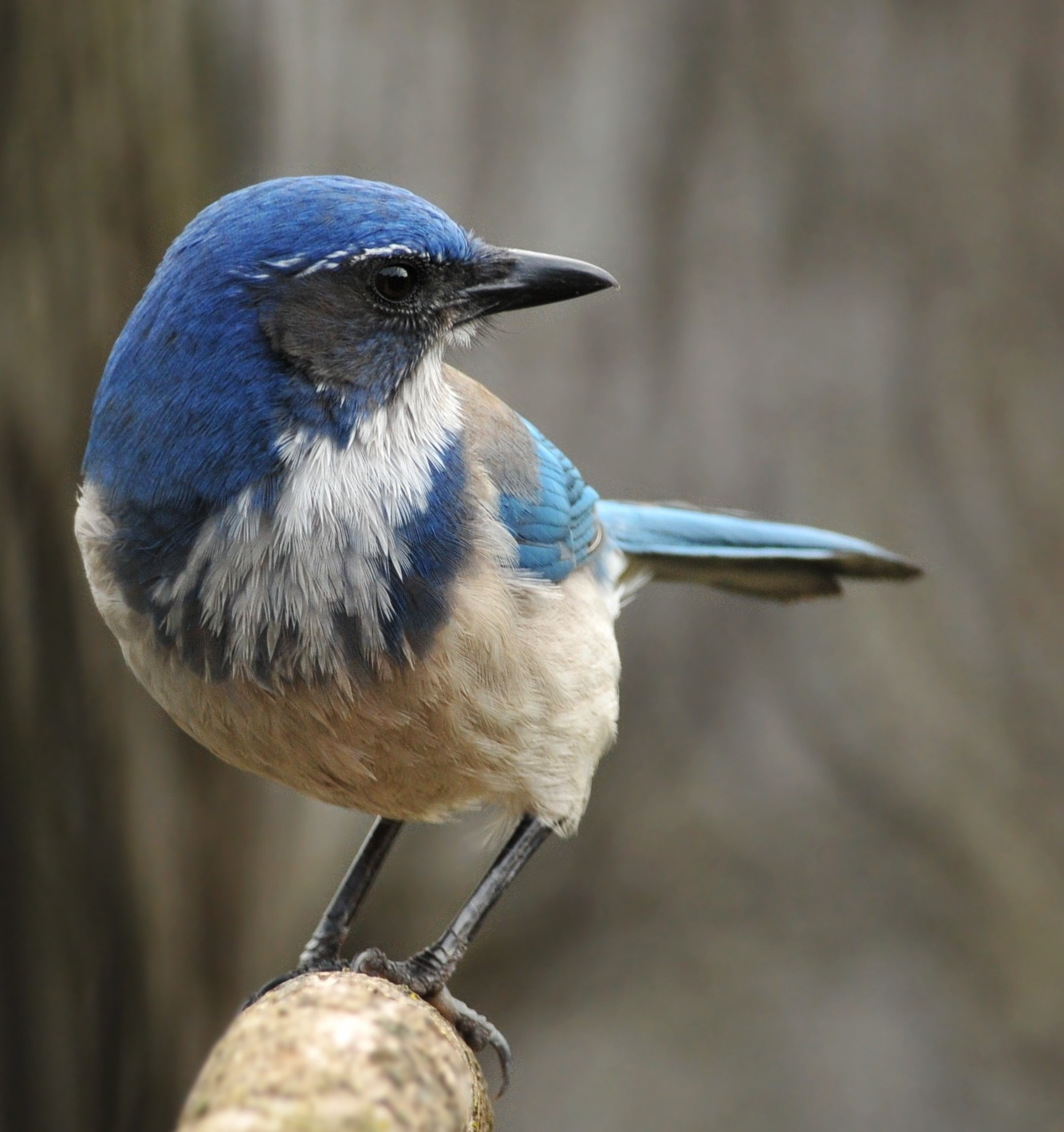
Western scrub jays may show evidence of possessing theory of mind

Scrub jays are also corvids. Western scrub jays (Aphelocoma californica) both cache food and pilfer other scrub jays' caches. They use a range of tactics to minimise the possibility that their own caches will be pilfered. One of these tactics is to remember which individual scrub jay watched them during particular caching events and adjust their re-caching behaviour accordingly. One study with particularly interesting results found that only scrub jays which had themselves pilfered would re-cache when they had been observed making the initial cache. This has been interpreted as the re-caching bird projecting its own experiences of pilfering intent onto those of another potential pilferer, and taking appropriate action.

== In dogs ==
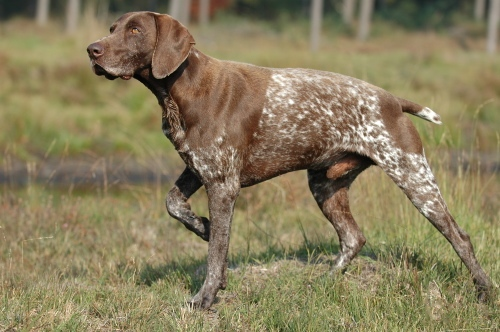
Dogs can use the pointing behaviour of humans to determine the location of food.

Domestic dogs (Canis familiaris) show an impressive ability to use the behaviour of humans to find food and toys using behaviours such as pointing and gazing. The performance of dogs in these studies is superior to that of NHPs, however, some have stated categorically that dogs do not possess a human-like ToM.

Similarly, dogs preferentially use the behaviour of the human Knower to indicate the location of food. This is unrelated to the sex or age of the dog. In another study, 14 of 15 dogs preferred the location indicated by the Knower on the first trial, whereas chimpanzees require approximately 100 trials to reliably exhibit the preference.

== In pigs ==
An experiment at the University of Bristol found that one out of ten pigs was possibly able to understand what other pigs can see. That pig observed another pig which had view of a maze in which food was being hidden, and trailed that pig through the maze to the food. The other pigs involved in the experiment did not.

== In goats ==
A 2006 study found that goats exhibited intricate social behaviours indicative of high-level cognitive processes, particularly in competitive situations. The study included an experiment in which a subordinate animal was allowed to choose between food that a dominant animal could also see and food that it could not; those who were subject to aggressive behaviour selected the food that the dominant animal could not see, suggesting that they are able to perceive a threat based on being within the dominant animal's view – in other words, visual perspective taking.

== See also ==
- List of animals by number of neurons
- Animal perception of magic
