= WRCM =

Coordinates: 35.060°N 80.670°W

- Wingate, North Carolina; United States
- Broadcast area: Charlotte/Metrolina
- Frequency: 91.9 MHz (HD Radio)

Programming
- Format: Contemporary worship music
- Subchannels: HD2: K-Love Pop; HD3: Air1 Música De Adoración
- Network: Air1

Ownership
- Owner: K-Love, Inc; (Educational Media Foundation)
- Sister stations: WNLV, WWLV, WMHK

History
- First air date: June 14, 1993
- Call sign meaning: Robertson C. McQuilkin (former president of Columbia Bible College, the former owner)

Technical information
- Licensing authority: FCC
- Facility ID: 12400
- Class: C2
- ERP: 30,000 watts
- HAAT: 151 meters (495 ft)
- Repeater: 95.1 WNLV-HD3 (Charlotte)

Links
- Public license information: Public file; LMS
- Webcast: Listen Live
- Website: air1.com

WRCM (91.9 FM) is a listener-supported, non-commercial radio station licensed to Wingate, North Carolina, and serving the Charlotte metropolitan area. It airs a contemporary worship radio format and identifies itself as "Air1". The station is owned by the Educational Media Foundation, based in Rocklin, California, a non-profit ministry. Some listeners can also hear K-LOVE on 95.1 in Charlotte, North Carolina or on 94.1 WWLV in Lexington, North Carolina.

== History ==
Columbia International University, then known as Columbia Bible College, applied to the FCC for the license in 1982. Internally, this effort was referred to as The 92 FM Project. Other entities applied on top of CBC, including Wingate College (now Wingate University) and a church in Waxhaw, North Carolina. After ten years of negotiations with the other groups, WRCM was granted the license and signed on the air by founding general manager Ken Mayfield at 12 noon on June 14, 1993. Present at sign on were CIU president Johnny Miller, CIU vice president John Davidson and former CIU president Robertson C. McQuilken. (The station's call letters -RCM- were in honor of his father, Robertson C. McQuilkin, the first president of Columbia Bible College.)

WRCM's first staff consisted of full-timers Ken Mayfield, the station's first general manager and afternoon personality, program director and morning host, Rodney Baucom, and Karen Wycoff, who served as mid-day announcer and secretary. Mayfield had built and managed another contemporary Christian station, WNOW and had hosted a very popular Sunday morning Contemporary Christian music program for 7 years on Charlotte's 100,000-watt WBCY (now WLNK). Part-time staff members included Shelly Mitchell and Joe Paulo. Paulo stepped into the role of general manager shortly after Mayfield departed in 1999.

Former logo of New Life 91.9

WRCM garnered immediate success with a 2.4 in its first Arbitron ratings. This success was despite the lack of advertising. Almost all of the "promotion" for the fledgling station had to come by word of mouth and from the station staff at Christian concerts.

Original plans were for WRCM to be a satellite station of Columbia Bible College's original station, WMHK. However, these plans were scrapped, and the station was largely operated and programmed separately from WMHK. However, longtime general manager Joe Paulo was named director of broadcasting at CIU after the departure of WMHK's General Manager Jerry Grimes, with oversight over both stations. Under his watch, WMHK began simulcasting WRCM's "Family Friendly Morning Show," and the two stations both aired the syndicated "Scott and Sam" show on weeknights.

== Signal ==
During its time as a local broadcaster, the station identified itself as "New Life 91.9, WRCM Wingate/Charlotte" and heavily promoted churches throughout the Charlotte metropolitan area. However, its signal is not as strong as those of the major FM stations in the Charlotte area. For most of its history, it operated at only 10,000 watts, resulting in marginal coverage even in some parts of Charlotte. In many of Charlotte's inner-ring suburbs, it could only be heard on car radios. It has since increased its power to 30,000 watts. However, it still operates from a tiny (by modern broadcasting standards) 495-foot tower near its former studios in Indian Trail. This is necessary to protect WSGE in Dallas, which is located on adjacent 91.7 FM. As a result, it still only provides grade B coverage to large parts of the market. Before the addition of the WRZM simulcast, most Christian music fans in the western part of the market got a better signal from WMIT in the Asheville area.

== Programming ==
Before its switch to K-LOVE, WRCM's music rotation consisted of six or seven current songs in heavy rotation and a mix of six or seven new songs and "classics" from the last two to five years in medium rotation played in a tight format, often back to back with only the station jingle separating songs from each other. New songs were chosen with the help of the listener advisory panel.

The station often promoted live concerts by Contemporary Christian (CCM) musicians, and carried out its Christian mission by performing good works such as collecting donations of baby clothes to support mothers in need who might otherwise consider getting abortions.

WRCM used the "Charlotte's Number One" Radio Jingle package from RadioScape until it switched to the K-LOVE programming format.

Starting in 2014, WRCM was simulcast on WRZM in Boiling Springs, North Carolina.

On October 6, 2014, it was announced that WRCM, along with translators WRZM, W268BU, and sister station WMHK, were being sold to EMF Broadcasting. The deal closed on December 19, 2014, a day later than expected because of last-minute legal issues. General manager Joe Paulo signed station off as a local broadcasting entity with a prayer and Chris Rice's rendition of "Great is Thy Faithfulness" at 4:32 p.m. At that point, WRCM flipped its programming to the national K-LOVE network. Paulo said that the hymn was the first song ever played on WRCM when it signed on in 1993. K-LOVE already owned WWLV in Lexington, North Carolina, which provides a fairly strong signal to the northern portion of the Charlotte market. The combined footprint of WMHK, WRCM/WLXK, WWLV, and WKVK gives K-LOVE at least secondary coverage to more than half of North and South Carolina.

In October 2026, WRCM switched to the company’s contemporary worship music "Air1" network after the purchase of a larger in-city signal for the K-Love contemporary Christian format.

== See also ==
- WNLV
- WWLV
- WMHK
