= Ibis GS-710 Magic =

Colombian homebuilt aircraft

GS-710 Magic

General information
- Type: Homebuilt aircraft
- National origin: Colombia
- Manufacturer: Ibis Aircraft
- Status: Production completed

History
- Developed from: Ibis GS-700 Magic

The Ibis GS-710 Magic, also called the GS-450, is a Colombian homebuilt aircraft that was designed and produced by Ibis Aircraft of Cali, developed from the Ibis GS-700 Magic. When it was available the aircraft was supplied as a complete ready-to-fly-aircraft or as a kit for amateur construction.

Production has been completed and as of 2011 the aircraft was no longer part of the company's product line.

== Design and development ==
The GS-710 Magic was designed to comply with the Fédération Aéronautique Internationale microlight category, including the category's maximum gross weight of 450 kg (992 lb).

The aircraft features a strut-braced high-wing, a two-seats-in-side-by-side configuration enclosed cabin with doors, fixed tricycle landing gear with wheel pants and a single engine in tractor configuration.

The GS-710 Magic is made from sheet aluminium "all-metal" construction, with the wing tips and cowling made from composite material. Its 8.69 m (28.5 ft) span wing employs a NACA 650-18m airfoil and mounts flaps. The wing employs conventional ailerons or, optionally, Junkers ailerons with leading edge slats and is supported by V-struts with jury struts. The main landing gear is sprung 7075-T6 aluminium, while the nose gear has lever suspension using rubber pucks and helical springs. The main wheels include hydraulic disc brakes.

The standard engine used is the 60 kW (80 hp) Rotax 912UL powerplant, driving a three-bladed Ivoprop propeller.

The aircraft's empty weight was reduced by 15% over the GS-700. The GS-710 has a typical empty weight of 279 kg (615 lb) and a gross weight of 450 kg (990 lb), giving a useful load of 171 kg (377 lb). A gross weight of 500 kg (1,102 lb) is optional.

== Specifications (GS-710 Magic) ==
Data from Jane's All The World's Aircraft 2012-2013

General characteristics

- Crew: one
- Capacity: one passenger
- Wingspan: 8.69 m (28 ft 6 in)
- Empty weight: 279 kg (615 lb)
- Gross weight: 450 kg (992 lb)
- Powerplant: 1 × Rotax 912 UL four cylinder, air and liquid-cooled, four stroke aircraft engine, 60 kW (80 hp)
- Propellers: 3-bladed Ivoprop

Performance

- Stall speed: 57 km/h (35 mph, 31 kn) with leading edge slats
