= Urraco =

Urraco is Spanish for Magpie. It may refer to:

- Ibis GS-501 Urraco, a Colombian aircraft design
- Lamborghini Urraco, an Italian car design
- Licania platypus, a tree native to Central America also known as the urraco.
