= Ibis GS-501 Urraco =

Colombian homebuilt aircraft

GS-501 Urraco

General information
- Type: Homebuilt aircraft
- National origin: Colombia
- Manufacturer: Ibis Aircraft
- Status: In production (2015)
- Number built: 58 (2010)

History
- Manufactured: 2000-present
- Introduction date: 2000
- Variant: Ibis GS-600 Arrow

The Ibis GS-501 Urraco (Magpie) is a Colombian homebuilt aircraft that was designed and produced by Ibis Aircraft of Cali, introduced in 2000. The aircraft is supplied as a complete ready-to-fly-aircraft or as a kit for amateur construction.

== Design and development ==
The GS-501 Urraco features a strut-braced high-wing, a two-seats-in-side-by-side configuration enclosed cabin with vertically-hinged doors, fixed tricycle landing gear with wheel pants and a single engine in tractor configuration.

The aircraft is made from sheet aluminium "all-metal" construction, with the wing tips and cowling made from composite material. Its 9.20 m (30.2 ft) span wing employs a NACA 650-18m airfoil, mounts flaps and has a wing area of 12.97 m^{2} (139.6 sq ft). The wing is supported by V-struts and jury struts. Two wings are available, the SuperSTOL, with double slotted flaps and the Express. The main landing gear is sprung 7075-T6 aluminium, while the nose gear has lever suspension using rubber pucks and helical springs. The main wheels include hydraulic disc brakes.

The acceptable power range is 75 to 119 kW (101 to 160 hp) and the standard engines used are the 75 kW (101 hp) Rotax 912ULS and the turbocharged 86 kW (115 hp) Rotax 914 powerplant, driving a three-bladed Ivoprop propeller. Continental Motors, Inc. or Lycoming Engines powerplants up to 119 kW (160 hp) may also be fitted.

The aircraft has a typical empty weight of 340 kg (750 lb) and a gross weight of 600 kg (1,300 lb), giving a useful load of 260 kg (570 lb). With full fuel of 55 kg (121 lb) the payload for pilot, passenger and baggage is 205 kg (452 lb).

The standard day, sea level, no wind, take off with a 75 kW (101 hp) engine is 100 m (328 ft) and the landing roll is 150 m (492 ft).

== Operational history ==
By 2010 the company reported that 58 Urracos had been delivered.

== Specifications (GS-501 Urraco) ==
Data from Jane's All The World's Aircraft 2012-2013

General characteristics

- Crew: one
- Capacity: one passenger
- Length: 6.37 m (20 ft 11 in)
- Wingspan: 9.20 m (30 ft 2 in)
- Height: 2.51 m (8 ft 3 in)
- Wing area: 12.97 m^{2} (139.6 sq ft)
- Empty weight: 340 kg (750 lb)
- Gross weight: 600 kg (1,323 lb)
- Fuel capacity: 76 litres (17 imp gal; 20 US gal)
- Powerplant: 1 × Rotax 912 ULS four cylinder, air and liquid-cooled, four stroke aircraft engine, 75 kW (100 hp)
- Propellers: 3-bladed Ivoprop

Performance

- Maximum speed: 185 km/h (115 mph, 100 kn)
- Cruise speed: 178 km/h (111 mph, 96 kn)
- Stall speed: 65 km/h (40 mph, 35 kn) flaps down
- Never exceed speed: 209 km/h (130 mph, 113 kn)
- Range: 563 km (350 mi, 304 nmi)
- Endurance: 3:30
- Service ceiling: 3,660 m (12,010 ft)
- g limits: +6/-3
- Rate of climb: 4.6 m/s (910 ft/min)
- Wing loading: 46.3 kg/m^{2} (9.5 lb/sq ft)
- Power/mass: 8.16 kg/kW
