= 7075 =

7075 may refer to:

- 7075 Sadovnichij, a main-belt asteroid discovered in 1979
- 7075 aluminium alloy
