= Magiq =

Magiq or MAGIQ may refer to:

- Multi-attribute global inference of quality, a multi-criteria decision analysis technique
- Multifunction Acquisition, Guiding, and Image Quality, an integrated system for acquisition, guiding, image quality measurement, for the Keck telescopes
- MagiQ Technologies, Inc., U.S. tech development company
- MAGIQ Entertainment, South Korean talent agency, whom represents actress Seo Hyo-rim
- Bova Magiq, a motorcoach bus
- "Magiq" (song), 2024 single by Youngn Lipz

== See also ==
- Magic (disambiguation)
- Magik (disambiguation)
- Magique (disambiguation)
- Majic (disambiguation)
- Majik (disambiguation)
