= Nightlife (role-playing game) =

1990 horror role-playing game

- Nightlife 2nd Edition Rulebook cover. Concept and design by Freda Cerny, art by Pamela Shanteau.
- Designers: Bradley K. McDevitt, L. Lee Cerny, Walter H. Mytczynskyj
- Publishers: Stellar Games
- Publication: 1990, 1991 (2nd Ed.), 1992 (3rd Ed.)
- Genres: Horror
- Systems: percentile die based

Nightlife is a horror-themed role-playing game first published by Stellar Games in 1990. Many of its innovations would be seen in later games such as White Wolf's World of Darkness.

== Overview ==
Nightlife is set in New York City in the then near-future of the 1990s. Players take on the roles of monsters, divided into several races and collectively referred to as "Kin," living secretly among human society, whom they refer to as "The Herd."

All of the Kin have certain attributes in common. They are immortal unless killed by special methods, immune to most diseases, and cannot be photographed. Most importantly, Kin have the ability to steal the life force of humans in order to survive, through a process called Drain. The Kin are divided into a number of groups, called Factions, who vary in their attitude toward humans and their willingness to be discreet about their activities. Players are generally encouraged to play Kin who prefer to defend Herd as well as Kin society, and to not kill mercilessly or wantonly.

The nightlife of Kin in New York City is one of the primary foci of the game. Kin spend much of their time preoccupied with subculture music and fashion, and the game's lists of equipment and clothing available to players assumes that they will adopt underground, cutting-edge, and designer styles. The city contains several important nightclubs which are run by and for Kin. In addition, a large part of the game is the constant streetfighting between members of various Kin factions.

== Races ==
Characters in Nightlife must belong to one of several races of Kin. Each race has access to different Edges and suffers from unique Flaws (see below).

- Animates: Animates are dead or inorganic matter that has somehow become sentient. Prominent examples include Frankenstein's monster, golems, homunculi, Galatea, or other humanoid and non-humanoid constructs which become possessed by spirits of the dead. Animates are rare among the kin. They are vulnerable to fire and sunlight, and automatically provoke hostility in nearby humans. They are also incapable of breaking a promise, once made. Many of them treat humans with outright contempt and join anti-Herd Factions. They can only feed by Draining, and do so by touching humans and sucking out their life force.
- Daemons: Daemons are extra-dimensional creatures who are trapped on earth. They resemble humans with small wings and horns and red-tinged skin, but have an Edge which allows them to change their shape in order to blend in. They are vulnerable to flint, holy relics, and fire, and can be controlled through magic rituals. They are usually bound to the contract their summoner used to bring them to the materiel plane, which can be used to compel their service; destroying the contract or completing its terms frees them. Like Animates, they Drain life force by touch.
- Inuit: Inuit are Native American spirits native to western North America. They are easily recognizable because they suffer a compulsion to dress in an extremely flamboyant manner. They are vulnerable to fire and repulsed by holy relics. Like Animates and Daemons, they Drain life force by touch.
- Ghosts: Ghosts are the most common kind of Kin. They are humans who died by violence or with some important task unfulfilled. They are normally incorporeal and invulnerable unless they choose to manifest themselves in solid form. They appear in the clothes they died in (making it hard for old or ancient Ghosts to fit in), and must make a Will roll once per day to change their outfit. They are vulnerable to cold iron, can be permanently banished through exorcism, and are bound to an object of significance to them in life, to which they must remain close for several hours each day. If the object is destroyed, then they permanently die.
- Vampyres: One of the most common races of Kin, vampyres Drain by feeding on the blood of their victims. They are vulnerable to sunlight, running water, garlic, wood, fire, and holy relics. They can also infect humans, turning them into vampires, and must sleep on a bed of earth taken from the land in which they were buried.
- Werewolves: Humans who have been infected by another werewolf and gain the ability to transform into a wolf. Werewolves do not need to Drain in order to survive, but can still do so in order to heal their injuries. They do this by assaulting humans and inflicting pain and injury. Werewolves are especially vulnerable to fire and silver.
- Wyghts: Wyghts are hideous creatures who cannot pass for human without a great deal of disguise. Their hair is white, and their skin resembles that of a gray, emaciated, dried-out corpse. Wyghts can be killed by fire, sunlight, and silver, and create more of their kind through infection, like vampyres and werewolves. They Drain their victims by touching them and leeching away their youth, causing them to age prematurely.

== Edges and Flaws ==
Kin have various superhuman powers called Edges. A character's Race determines his Beginning Edges, with which he starts the game, and also his Racial Edges, which he does not possess automatically but can learn later. Some Edges can be learned by any Kin, regardless of Race.

Kin also suffer from Flaws, supernatural weaknesses determined by their Race, such as a vampyre's vulnerability to the sun. Flaws do not change throughout the course of play.

== Skills ==
Skill levels are generated during character creation by rolling 20 d10. The pool of points are split among the selected skills. which are divided into the Combat, Unarmed Combat, Archaic, and General skills groups. Combat is the use of melee and ranged weapons and Unarmed Combat is the use of combatives styles like Street Fighting, Martial Arts or Wrestling. General Skills cover modern trades and abilities used in the (then) late 20th Century. Archaic skills are anachronistic trades and abilities that are not actively used nowadays (like Manuscript Illumination or Charioteering), that were either learned by the character in the past or acquired by them in the present day as hobby skills. Etiquette: Kin and Knowledge: Kin are Archaic group skills that are rare for non-Kin to possess. The Luck attribute can be used for when a character wants to use a skill that they don't know, using the skill's governing Attribute plus (Luck ÷ 5) to get the result. Having a skill at level 20 means the character is "competent" and doesn't need to make a successful roll to perform it.

== Factions ==
Kin are divided into a number of factions. While there are numerous small factions, gangs, and splinter groups, a handful of Factions commands the loyalty of most Kin.

- The Commune: The Commune believes in (relatively) peaceful coexistence with Herd society. The Commune battles against other Factions who carelessly and indiscreetly kill humans, or attempt to destabilize human civilization. The Commune has no qualms about engaging in vicious street battles with members of other Factions, but tries to conceal the fact that the fights are going on between superhuman creatures.
- The Complex: The Complex believes that the Herd is only fit to be ruled, exploited, and fed upon. Although merciless, they are generally discreet and less of a threat than the more radical factions. The Complex gains power by working toward gaining control over organized crime in New York City.
- The Morningstar Corporation: The Morningstar Corporation wants to conquer humanity, and believes that the best way to do so is from within. They attempt to destabilize human civilization by infiltrating high society, politics, and big business, and attempting to cause financial and economic chaos. They are believed to be responsible for the Wall Street crash of 1929. Their membership consists mostly of vampyres and daemons.
- Red Moonrise: Red Moonrise is a terrorist organization who believe that humanity must be subjugated through acts of random, wholesale slaughter. They are the most dangerous of the Factions because of their ruthlessness, sadism, and unwillingness to adequately conceal their superhuman nature. Their exploits resulted in the secret extermination of Kin society in Boulder, Colorado by the U.S. Government. They are made up almost exclusively of werewolves and wyghts.

== Game mechanics ==
Nightlife rules use only ten-sided dice, or d10s. Rolls are usually made by adding one of several Attributes to a Skill, and then attempting to roll less than the total on a percentile die. In some cases, several d10s are rolled and then added together, as in rolling attributes and skills at character creation, or gaining new skills and bonuses at the end of each adventure.

The primary Attributes are Strength, Dexterity, Fitness, Intellect, Will, Perception, Attractiveness, and Luck, and are rolled on 4d10. They are similar to those of Dungeons & Dragons, with Fitness being equivalent to Constitution, Intellect being equal to Intelligence, Attractiveness being equal to Charisma, and Will replacing Wisdom. Luck is a catch-all attribute for when the game master isn't sure what attribute would be best used in a skill test. Then there are secondary attributes created by using the primary attributes. Survival Points are calculated by adding the character's Strength and Luck attributes together. They are depleted daily to feed the Kin and are replenished by Draining Herd. The Hand-To-Hand damage modifier (HTH) is calculated by dividing Strength by 7. It is applied in unarmed or armed melee combat.

One of the ways in which players are encouraged to play Herd-sympathetic Kin is the use of the Humanity score. Beginning players start in character creation with a base Humanity of 50, and can only attain a maximum Humanity of 100. As a character's Humanity drops, he begins to suffer the effects of his Flaws more severely (such as a werewolf taking even more damage from silver than normal). New Edges or increased levels in current Edges cost Humanity to purchase, and raising the character's Humanity by performing humane deeds causes the character's abilities to increase at the end of each adventure. (Nightlife, unlike many role-playing games, does not use experience points.)

== Supplements ==
- Magic: Sorcerers, Witches, Cults, and Organizations [1990]: Introduces sorcerers as a playable Race, along with spells, as well as more rules for gangs, cults, organizations, and monsters.
- NightLife Reference Screen and City Planner Accessories [1991]: Reference screen, character records, the mini-adventure "Icing the body-electric", plus six adventure ideas and encounters.
- America After Dark [1991]: A Sourcebook and Adventure for NIGHTLIFE. Expands the background and coverage of New York from the main book and adds chapters on Kin activity in Chicago, Cleveland, Houston, Washington D.C., and the fictional college-town of Olds-Camp, Pennsylvania. Adds new Gangs, new Races (Were-Coyotes), and new NPCs. Includes "Deadly Sparkle", a complete adventure about a new designer street drug that takes place across multiple cities.
- In the Musical Vein [1991]: An adventure book that focuses on the musical subculture of the Kin. The supplement provides a campaign setting which assumes that the protagonists will play members of a rock band. The supplement also introduces us to "Resurrection music," a fictional genre of music created by Kin which combines and exaggerates the extremely fast-paced elements of jazz, rap, and speed metal.
- Kinrise [1992]: An alternate-setting supplement wherein the Kin try to survive in a post-nuclear holocaust landscape.
- NightMoves [1993]: This supplement is a complete adventure featuring new gangs and new characters. An appendix briefly covers Greenwich Village history, geography and points of interest.

== Reception ==
Christopher Earley reviewed Nightlife in White Wolf #24 (Dec./Jan. 1990), rating it a 3 out of 5 and stated that "NightLife is [...] a game with minor developmental flaws, using a sometimes too simple game system. Only future adventures will reveal the long-term viability of the setting, or more accurately, determine it. Splatterpunk alone, even without the more artistic aspects, looks to be a fertile milieu, and there is enough separating this game from other horror RPGs to make it worth its price, 'shallowness' aside."

Christopher Earley reviewed Nightlife Third Edition roleplaying game in White Wolf #37 (July/Aug. 1993), rating it a 3 out of 5 and stated that "Unfortunately, the greatest portion of NightLife Third Edition is material that has already seen print in previous supplements. This is a boon to the newcomers, making for a game with enough goodies to keep them adventuring for months to come. It does lend a few compelling reasons for the old guard to purchase it."

In a retrospective review in Issue 43 of InQuest Gamer, Jason Schneiderman noted, "Although largely undeveloped, all the seeds for what became White Wolf's hugely successful World of Darkness games are here, including a 'humanity' system and something similar to 'the Masquerade,' whereby monsters seek to keep their identities secret so humans won't become aware of their existence. What you won't find is angst; NightLife was a punk-rock, claw and fangfest that drips with late-80's cool."

In his 2023 book Monsters, Aliens, and Holes in the Ground, RPG historian Stu Horvath noted, "The real pleasure of the game is its depiction of a '90s New York City before so much of the rock subculture got sucked out of it. The game city is a rich setting full of gangs, corporations, secret societies, oddballs, weirdos, clubs, bars, and just about anything else imaginable."

== Reviews ==
- C64 Fun
