= WMHK =

Christian radio station in Columbia, South Carolina

Coordinates: 34.097°N 80.764°W

- Columbia, South Carolina; United States
- Broadcast area: Midlands
- Frequency: 89.7 MHz (HD Radio)

Programming
- Format: Contemporary Christian music
- Subchannels: HD2: Air1; HD3: K-Love Eras
- Network: K-Love

Ownership
- Owner: Educational Media Foundation; (K-LOVE, Inc)

History
- First air date: August 30, 1976
- Call sign meaning: We Make Him Known, from the motto of Columbia International University

Technical information
- Licensing authority: FCC
- Facility ID: 12410
- Class: C
- ERP: 100,000 watts
- HAAT: 426 meters (1,398 ft)
- Translator: HD2: 91.7 W219CY (Irmo)

Links
- Public license information: Public file; LMS
- Webcast: Listen Live; Listen Live (HD2); Listen Live (HD3)
- Website: klove.com air1.com (HD2)

WMHK (89.7 FM) is a non-commercial Christian radio station in Columbia, South Carolina. It is owned and operated by the Educational Media Foundation. Its programming is Contemporary Christian music programmed from K-LOVE studios in Rocklin, California.

WMHK is one of South Carolina's most powerful stations. It provides at least grade B coverage to much of the South Carolina portions of the Charlotte and Augusta areas, and can be heard clearly as far east as Florence and as far west as Union.

== History ==
Columbia International University signed WMHK on the air August 30, 1976, with a vision to share the Gospel through the airwaves. Until its sale to the Educational Media Foundation, it was unique in the sense that it was locally owned and operated, while most radio stations in Columbia are corporate owned. During its time as a locally owned station, WMHK enjoyed much higher ratings than most other CCM stations.

Jim Marshall, former general manager of WMHK, was responsible for the revitalization of the station, changing the format from the older-style Christian music and adding a contemporary feel to the broadcasts. Under his direction, WMHK became one of the most popular CCM stations in the country, and was the first South Carolina station to win a Marconi Award. The morning show and the afternoon drive program became more sophisticated, featuring local weather personalities like WOLO Meteorologist Reg Taylor and live local traffic reports from WIS' Traffic Command center, as well as news updates from its own award-winning news department with Bob Holmes and Dwight Moffitt. Since then, staffing changes saw the departure of long-time morning host Rusty Rabon, who left for the ministry, along with the eventually closing of the news department. Marshall left in 2005 to become general manager of WAY-FM in West Palm Beach, FL. For many years, its "Family Friendly Morning Show" with Steve Sunshine and Amy Byrd was among the top rated in the Columbia market among women ages 25–54.

Jerry Grimes, former Marketing Director at WIS, succeeded Marshall as General Manager in July 2005. Under his direction, there were a few staffing changes, including the promotion of Steve Sunshine to Program Director in August 2006 after long-time Program Director Tom Greene left the station to go to WMIT. Under Grimes, WMHK was also named "Station of the Year" by the Christian Music Broadcasters (CMB) in 2006 and 2007. After Jerry Grimes departed to join WAY-FM in Florida, John Owens replaced him, leading the station to another Station of the Year award in 2009.

In 2010, after Steve Sunshine left to start a new station in Austin, Texas (Spirit 105.9), Jeff Cruz was hired as the new Program Director.

During its time under CIU ownership, WMHK was a sister station to WRCM in Charlotte, North Carolina. It was largely programmed separately from WMHK, but WMHK did share WRCM's "It's A New Day" Morning Show with Eric & Heather, which was also syndicated to the WORD-FM radio network in Philadelphia. Joe Paulo, WRCM's former general manager, served as director of broadcasting for CIU and had oversight over both stations.

In September 2014, WMHK was again the winner of Station of the Year from the CMB, presented at the annual Christian radio conference in Orlando. Then one month later, on October 6, 2014, it was announced that WMHK and WRCM were being sold to EMF Broadcasting. The deal closed on December 19, 2014, a day later than expected because of last-minute legal issues. The founding general manager, David Morrison, who signed the station on the air in 1976 with a prayer, also signed the station off as a local broadcasting entity with a prayer at 7:07 p.m. At that point, WMHK flipped its programming to the national K-LOVE network.

== Programming ==
As a member of the K-LOVE network, WMHK is a non-profit, listener-supporter radio station.

Formerly as a ministry of Columbia International University, WMHK programmed most of the day with music with Bible teaching programs weekday evenings and children's radio programs on Saturday mornings. Examples of Bible teaching programs during the late 1990s included Greg Laurie, Dr. Charles Stanley, Dr. Tony Evans, and Adrian Rogers. Other evening programs included Focus on the Family and Family Life Today. In addition, Bob Holmes and Dwight Moffit provided local news coverage during the morning and afternoon shows along with the weekly newsmagazine "Vantage Point". Over time, spoken programs were reduced, giving way to primarily music coverage. By 2010, only two non-music programs were aired in the evenings.

The station always had a core foundation as a ministry that was behind the music, on-air personalities and contests. Its programming included a Contemporary Christian music rotation selected by the Program Director and a team of listeners known as the "Music Team". The final local on-air lineup included the "It's a New Day" Morning Show with Eric and Heather (based out of WRCM) with Joe "JP" Polek inserting local updates (6-10 a.m.), Mike Weston (10 a.m. - 1 p.m.), Jeff Cruz (1-3 p.m.), Michelle Renew (3-7 p.m.), and Terese Main (7 p.m. - Midnight).

== See also ==
- Columbia International University
- WRCM
- K-LOVE
