= Magica =

Magica or Magicka may refer to:

- Magica (album), a 2000 album by heavy metal band Dio
- Magica (band), a Romanian power metal band
- Magica De Spell, a fictional character in the Scrooge McDuck universe
- Magicka, a 2011 action-adventure video game by Arrowhead Game Studios and Paradox Interactive
  - Magicka 2, a 2015 action-adventure video game by Pieces Interactive and Paradox Interactive

== See also ==
- Costa Magica, a cruise ship originally operated by Costa Cruises
- Majika, a 2006 Philippine television drama fantasy series
- Nobuhle Majika (born 1991), Zimbabwean footballer
- Magic (disambiguation)
- Magico (disambiguation)
