= Magique =

Magique is the French word for magic and may refer to:

- Magique (Marvel Comics), a fictional character in the Marvel Universe
- Magique (mascot), a mascot for the 1992 Winter Olympic Games in Albertville, France
- Magique (footballer) (born 1993), Ivorian footballer
- Le magique, 1996 Tunisian drama film

== See also ==
- Magic (disambiguation)
- Magik (disambiguation)
- Magiq (disambiguation)
- Majic (disambiguation)
- Majik (disambiguation)
