= Magik (disambiguation) =

Magik is an alias used by Marvel Comics X-Men character Illyana Rasputin.

Magik may also refer to:

== Comics ==
- Magik (Amanda Sefton), an alias used by Marvel Comics character Amanda Sefton
- Magik (1983 comic book), a 4-issue comic book limited series concerning Illyana Rasputina, the X-Man 'Magik', published by Marvel Comics in 1983–84
- Mystic Arcana: Magik, an issue of the 4-issue 2007 comic book limited series Mystic Arcana concerning Illyana Rasputina, the X-Man 'Magik', published by Marvel Comics

== Music ==
- Magik, a fictional band in the 2008 film Rock On!!
- Magik (rapper) (1978–2000), Polish rapper
- Magik (album series), a trance mix-compilation album series by Tiësto
  - Magik One: First Flight, the first in a series of seven albums by DJ Tiësto
- "Magik", a 2006 song by Paula P-Orridge

== Other uses ==
- Magik (programming language), an object-oriented language
- Magik-FM, former name of the Philippine radio station DXMA-FM

== See also ==
- Magic (disambiguation)
- Magiq (disambiguation)
- Magique (disambiguation)
- Majic (disambiguation)
- "Magik 2.0", a song by 'B.o.B'
- Magik 3, a fictional band from the children's novels Day of the Iguana and Holy Enchilada!
- Magyk, 2005 novel by Angie Sage
- Time and Magik, an interactive fiction game trilogy
- Magik and Rose, a 2001 New Zealand film starring Alison Bruce
