= Ibis GS-750 Grand Magic =

Colombian homebuilt airplane from Ibis Aircraft

GS-750 Grand Magic

General information
- Type: Homebuilt aircraft
- National origin: Colombia
- Manufacturer: Ibis Aircraft
- Status: In production (2015)

History
- Manufactured: 2006-present
- Introduction date: 2006
- Developed from: Ibis GS-700 Magic

The Ibis GS-750 Grand Magic is a Colombian homebuilt aircraft, designed and produced by Ibis Aircraft of Cali, introduced in 2006. The aircraft is supplied as a complete ready-to-fly-aircraft or as a kit for amateur construction.

== Design and development ==
The GS-750 Grand Magic is a development of the two-seat Ibis GS-700 Magic. It features a strut-braced high-wing, a four-seat enclosed cabin with doors, fixed tricycle landing gear with wheel pants and a single engine in tractor configuration.

The aircraft is made from sheet aluminium "all-metal" construction, with the wing tips and cowling made from composite material. Its 9.70 m (31.8 ft) span wing employs a NACA 650-18m airfoil, mounts flaps and has a wing area of 15.71 m^{2} (169.1 sq ft). The wing is supported by V-struts and jury struts. The main landing gear is sprung 7075-T6 aluminium, while the nose gear has lever suspension using rubber pucks and helical springs. The main wheels include hydraulic disc brakes.

The acceptable power range is 113 to 157 kW (152 to 211 hp) and the standard engines used are the eight cylinder 134 kW (180 hp) Jabiru 5100 and, since July 2010, the 157 kW (211 hp) Lycoming IO-390-X powerplant.

The aircraft has a typical empty weight of 520 kg (1,150 lb) and a gross weight of 1,020 kg (2,250 lb), giving a useful load of 500 kg (1,100 lb). With full fuel of 151.4 L (33.3 imp gal; 40.0 US gal) the payload for pilot, passengers and baggage is 391 kg (862 lb).

The standard day, sea level, no wind, take off with a 113 kW (152 hp) engine is 250 m (820 ft) and the landing roll is 300 m (984 ft).

== Operational history ==
In February 2007 the prototype was delivered to a customer in Ecuador.

== Specifications (GS-750 Grand Magic) ==
Data from Jane's All The World's Aircraft 2012-2013 and Manufacturer

General characteristics

- Crew: one
- Capacity: three passengers
- Length: 7.20 m (23 ft 7 in)
- Wingspan: 9.70 m (31 ft 10 in)
- Height: 2.18 m (7 ft 2 in)
- Wing area: 15.71 m^{2} (169.1 sq ft)
- Aspect ratio: 6:1
- Empty weight: 520 kg (1,146 lb)
- Gross weight: 1,020 kg (2,249 lb)
- Fuel capacity: 151.4 litres (33.3 imp gal; 40.0 US gal)
- Powerplant: 1 × Lycoming O-320 four cylinder, air-cooled, four stroke aircraft engine, 110 kW (150 hp)
- Propellers: 3-bladed fixed pitch

Performance

- Maximum speed: 193 km/h (120 mph, 104 kn)
- Cruise speed: 177 km/h (110 mph, 96 kn)
- Stall speed: 89 km/h (55 mph, 48 kn) flaps down
- Never exceed speed: 241 km/h (150 mph, 130 kn)
- Service ceiling: 3,600 m (11,800 ft)
- g limits: +5/-3
- Rate of climb: 5.08 m/s (1,000 ft/min)
- Wing loading: 64.9 kg/m^{2} (13.3 lb/sq ft)
