= Magical =

Magical is the adjective for magic. It may also refer to:

- Magical (horse) (foaled 2015), Irish Thoroughbred racehorse
- "Magical" (song), released in 1985 by John Parr
- Magical: Disney's New Nighttime Spectacular of Magical Celebrations, a 2009–2014 summer fireworks show at Disneyland
- Magical Company, a Japanese entertainment company
- "Magical", a 2004 song by Shifty Shellshock from Happy Love Sick
- "Magical", a 2009 song by Sean Kingston from Tomorrow
