= Majik =

Majik may refer to:

== People ==
- J Majik, English DJ
- Don Majkowski (born 1964), U.S. player of American football nicknamed "Majik"

== Groups, organizations ==
- Majik Records, record label
- Majik Ninja Entertainment, record label
- Majik Boys, U.S. DJ group
- Monkey Majik, Japanese band

== Other uses ==
- "Majik of Majiks", song by Cat Stevens

== See also ==
- Magic (disambiguation)
- Magiq (disambiguation)
- Magique (disambiguation)
- Majic (disambiguation)
- Majyk series, a novel series by Esther Friesner
