= In the Musical Vein =

In the Musical Vein is a 1991 role-playing adventure for Nightlife published by Stellar Games.

== Contents ==
In the Musical Vein is an adventure in which the supernatural Kin music scene of New York is the setting.

== Publication history ==
In the Musical Vein was the second support product and first adventure published for Nightlife.

== Reception ==
Christopher Earley reviewed In the Musical Vein in White Wolf #29 (Oct./Nov., 1991), rating it a 3 out of 5 and stated that "There is [...] a question as to the intent behind some of the supplement's subject matter. It's easy to imagine people being offended by a few indelicate topics found in Musician Vein. The game master's handling of theses elements in play is what sets the difference between a horrific tale that stresses the monstrosities of human nature, and crude shock value for its own sake."
