= America After Dark =

America After Dark is a 1991 role-playing supplement for Nightlife published by Stellar Games.

== Contents ==
America After Dark is a supplement in which the setting expands to the cities of Chicago, Cleveland, Houston, and Washington D.C.

== Reception ==
Christopher Earley reviewed America Afterdark in White Wolf #34 (Jan./Feb., 1993), rating it a 3 out of 5 and stated that "NightLife supplements are very good about providing post-adventure source material, so America Afterdark can shape future sessions nicely."
