= WLXK =

- Boiling Springs, North Carolina; United States
- Broadcast area: Greenville-Spartanburg, South Carolina
- Frequency: 88.3 MHz
- Branding: Truth Network

Programming
- Format: Christian talk

Ownership
- Owner: Educational Media Foundation

History
- Former call signs: WGWG (Until 2013); WRZM (2013–2014)

Technical information
- Licensing authority: FCC
- Facility ID: 23156
- Class: C2
- ERP: 50,000 watts
- HAAT: 92.0 meters
- Transmitter coordinates: 35°13′52.00″N 81°42′57.00″W

Links
- Public license information: Public file; LMS
- Webcast: WGWG "The Range"

WLXK (88.3 FM) is a radio station broadcasting a Christian talk format. Licensed to Boiling Springs, North Carolina, United States, the station is currently owned by the Educational Media Foundation.

Gardner–Webb University radio station WGWG signed on in 1974 with beautiful music and "The Afternoon Rock Show". The signal increased to 50,000 watts in 1994. Streaming began in 1998. By 1999, the format included music performed live in the studio, talk shows, and high school football. The music format changed from adult album alternative in 2010. Gardner–Webb announced the sale of the 88.3 frequency and the move by the radio station to online-only June 28, 2013.

As WRZM it simulcasted WRCM in Wingate, North Carolina when it was owned by Columbia International University. On October 6, 2014, it was announced that then-WRZM, along with WRCM and its translators, were being sold to EMF Broadcasting. The deal closed on December 19, 2014, a day later than expected because of last-minute legal issues. WRCM's General Manager Joe Paulo signed the station off as a local broadcasting entity with a prayer and Chris Rice's rendition of "Great Is Thy Faithfulness" at 4:32 p.m. At that point, WRCM and WRZM flipped its programming to the national K-LOVE network.

K-LOVE changed the call letters of WRZM to WLXK later that year, which is now known as "K-Love Greenville-Spartanburg".

In April 2024, K-LOVE ended programming on 88.3 due to the acquisition of WRTS (now WLTS) and WLTE. It was sold to the Truth Network and its programming began shortly after a redirect loop reminding listeners to flip to 95.5 and 103.3, as well as 91.9 from Charlotte and 94.1 from the Triad area (which can be received over areas north of Charlotte).
