= Magic 5 =

Indonesian teen fantasy television series

- Also known as: Magic 5 New Season; Magic 5 Season 3; Magic 5 Pesantren Edition
- Genre: Teen; Fantasy; Drama
- Screenplay by: Team MKF
- Directed by: A. Septian; Usman Jiro; Sondang Pratama; Bobby Moeryawan; M. Dinesh Samby
- Starring: Basmalah Gralind; Raden Rakha; Ahmad Afan Khadafy; Rabiunahar Rizta Ramdhan; Washifa Assegaf; Arie Nugroho; Kimberly Angela; Habibi Hood; Kiesha Alvaro; Metta Permadi; Oka Sugawa; Puspita Sarry; Kevin Hillers; Rama Michael; Voke Victoria; Dirly; Zora Vidyanata; Eksanti
- Composer: Iswara Giovani
- Country of origin: Indonesia
- Original language: Indonesian
- No. of seasons: 4
- No. of episodes: 757

Production
- Executive producer: Subagio S.
- Producers: Sonu S.; Sonya S.; Shalu S.
- Cinematography: Wahadi Wos
- Editor: Team MKF
- Camera setup: Multi-camera
- Running time: 60 minutes
- Production company: Mega Kreasi Films

Original release
- Network: Indosiar
- Release: 20 March 2023 – 8 June 2025

Magic 5 is an Indonesian television series produced by Mega Kreasi Films which aired from 20 March 2023 to 8 June 2025 on Indosiar. It starred Basmalah Gralind, Raden Rakha, and Afan.

== Series overview ==
Season	Episodes	Originally released	
Season	Episodes	First released	Last released
1	342	20 March 2023	5 March 2024
2	245	6 March 2024	6 November 2024
3	136	7 November 2024	30 March 2025
4	34	5 May 2025	8 June 2025

== Plot ==
=== Season 1 ===
Naura, Rahsya, Adara, Gibran, and Irshad are five children accidentally discovered by Fathir—a wealthy man who had recently lost his wife and child in a hit-and-run accident. These five children possess different powers that they only discovered as teenagers. Along the way, they use their powers to solve social problems. At school, they encounter "The Beast" gang, which is always causing trouble.

=== New Season ===
Fathir, Salma, and Noah are involved in a plane crash. Naura, Rahsya, Adara, Gibran, and Irshad, who are now in high school, are raised by Fathir's siblings, Hadi and Anggi, who are Fathir's will.

=== Season 3 ===
Naura, Rahsya, Adara, Irshad, Gibran, and Dika visit Gibran's grandparents in Jakarta. There, they meet Raymond—the adopted son of Grandpa Gibran's family—who plans to eliminate the Magic 5 and Dika.

=== Pesantren Edition ===
Naura Although declared dead, her body has not been found, and this leaves her friends—Rahsya, Gibran, Irsyad, Adara, and Dika —deeply devastated and devastated.

One day, their school holds a pesantren program on the outskirts of Jakarta. Even though Naura is absent, the pesantren activities continue as usual. However, a surprise arises when the Magic 5 see a man resembling Panji, whom they suspect has evil intentions. It turns out the man is not Panji, but Ustaz Fajar.

== Cast ==
- Basmalah Gralind as Naura
- Raden Rakha as Rahsya
- Ahmad Afan Khadafy as Gibran
- Rabiunahar Rizta Ramdhan as Irshad
- Washifa Assegaf as Pipit
- Panji Saputra as Praja
- Gabriella Quinlyn as Jasmine
- Aditya Herpavi as Elon
- Farell Akbar as Reza
- Habil Nugraha as Boy
- Xavier Nainggolan as Joe
- Clarisse Harun Giroux as Stefani
- Selma Kusic as Kiara
- Sridevi as Adara
- Gabriel Harun Giroux as Dika
- Temmy Rahadi as Fathir
- Medina as Salma
- Zora Vidyanata as Miranda
- Dolly Martin as Parno
- Jirayut as Dafa Henandra
- Nizam Hasan as Raihan Henandra
- Electra Leslie as Violetta
- Adryan Didi as Kevin
- Alifa Lubis as Jenny
- Montserrat Gizelle as Queen
- Christine Djogja as Retno
- Putty Noor as Nancy
- Oka Sugawa as Tonny
- Puspita Sarry as Larasati
- Kevin Hillers as Tama
- Rama Michael as Miko
- Voke Victoria as Mila
- Rizal Akbar as Restu
- Natasya Emylia Hidayat as Nur
- Dirly as Frans Maxime Sanjaya
- Diva Nursyifa as Petir
- Enny Surachman as Enny
- Ade Herlina as Nenek Asih
- Noel Londok as Angga
- Irene Librawati as Lila
- Luna Fournier as Gina
- Novia Rianti as Kinan
- Ramdhani Qubil AJ as Deden
- Shofia Shireen as Alina
- Jasmine Meijers as Clarissa
- Arie Nugroho as Noah
- Kimberly Angela as Lisa
- Habibi Hood as Hadi
- Gita Sinaga as Anggi
- Daniel Leo as Surya
- Anggie Merdianty as Anggie
- Putri Isnari as Mutia
- Hari Putra as Ferry
- Daffy Putra as Eric
- Rizka Frisca as Marimar
- Rika Rahman as Linda
- Robert Yuhendra as Dion
- Delia Alena as Mama Vio
- Rifky Dee as Vino
- Kier King as King
- Cantika Putri Kirana as Juleha Kalsum
- Bogel Alkatiri as Ucup
- Qya Ditra as Ditra
- Metta Permadi as Rara
- Dava Nursyafa as Badai
- Dasha March as Sholeha
- Asyraaf Barawas as Sholeh
- Alvian Jabir as Mbah Gono
- Kiesha Alvaro as Al Abyan
- Hans Hosman as Zarlo
- Girindra Kara as Sari Kumalasari
- Radja Nasution as Alif
- Darren Rafid Khairan as Galih
- Angel Marianne as Iis
- Khanz Braga as Wira
- Rachel Oldham as Jessica & Mawar
- Richard Derrick as Asep
- Ciara Nadine Brosnan as Mili
- Nadira Sungkar as Rosalinda
- Jameelah Saleem as Hana
- Raya Adena Syah as Lola
- Rachel Mikhayla as Ceria
- Tyas Mirasi as Mitha
- Eksanti as Melati
- Tengku Tezi as Raymond
- Dicky Andryanto as Jaya
- Najla Atila as Bella
- Valery Verhey as Meli / Riris
- Nikita as Aini
- Alfian Anthony as Evan
- Devon Lucca as Mike
- Ustad Dion as Dion
- Linda Leona as Ratu Kegelapan
- Ustad Doni as Doni
- Caroline Dollivia as Julia
- Fatu Yaffa as Fatu
- Saif Annur as Rizky
- Cheikna Yaffa as Cheikha
- Ucup Gembul as Ucup
- Icha Iksania as Saleha
- Brooklyn Alif Rea as Jessica
- Adrian Aliman as kepala sekolah
- Arif Yusuf as wakil kepala sekolah
- Ichal Muhammad as Rizal
- Giovani Benaya as Bari
- Mireille as Ririn
- Bernie Allen as teman Yuda
- Bertrand Melfredes as teman Yuda
- Amanda Lucson as Sissy
- Tommy Desvico as Tommy
- Annisa Natasya as Annisa
- Sutan Simatupang as Pati Sewo
- Samudra Ali as Yuda
- Roy Barata as Mr. Spooky
- Ritter Juan as Tobi
- Jihan Sherlyna as Ayumi
- Devon Lucca as Mike
- Bagas Setya as Bagas
- Teuku Dino as Dino
- Firstriana Aldila as Dilla
- Emir Fahlevie as Rusdi
- Abimanyu Satriajie as Abhi
- Indra Rooney as Baron
- Andre Geovano as Ben
- Vania Azka Priscilla as Vania
- Denino as Jafar
- Sania Velova as Mama Kitty

== Production ==
=== Development ===
In March 2024, the series was renamed "Magic 5 New Season".

=== Casting ===
Rachel Oldham were roped in to play Mawar.

== Awards and nominations ==
Year	Award	Category	Recipient	Result	Ref.
2024	Indonesian Television Awards 2024	Most Popular Primetime Drama Programs	Magic 5	Nominated	
2024	Indonesian Television Awards 2024	Best Actor - Popular	Raden Rakha	Nominated	
2024	Indonesian Television Awards 2024	Best Actress - Popular	Basmalah Gralind	Nominated	
2024	Indonesian Television Awards 2024	Best Actress - Popular	Sridevi	Nominated	
2025	Indonesian Drama Series Awards	Favorite Supporting Actress in a Drama Series	Sridevi	Nominated	
2025	Indonesian Drama Series Awards	Favorite Drama Series Soundtracks	"Bertauhid" by Sridevi, Afan, Eby	Nominated	
2025	Indonesian Television Awards	Most Popular Primetime Drama Programs	Magic 5	Nominated	
