= Ibis GS-240 =

Colombian homebuilt aircraft

GS-240

General information
- Type: Light-sport aircraft
- National origin: Colombia
- Manufacturer: Ibis Aircraft
- Status: Production completed

The Ibis GS-240 is a Colombian homebuilt aircraft that was designed and produced by Ibis Aircraft of Cali. When it was available the aircraft was supplied as a kit for amateur construction.

The GS-240 is no longer offered by the manufacturer as part of their product line.

== Design and development ==
The aircraft was designed as a light-sport aircraft, specifically for the American market and features a strut-braced high-wing, a two-seats-in-side-by-side configuration enclosed cabin accessed via doors, fixed tricycle landing gear with wheel pants and a single engine in tractor configuration.

The aircraft is made from sheet aluminum "all-metal" construction. Its wing is supported by V-stuts and jury struts. The GS-240 was supplied as a quick-build kit, with most major fabrication completed prior to delivery to allow for quick assembly time.

The standard day, sea level, no wind, take off distance over a 15 m (49 ft) obstacle is 91 m (299 ft).

As of April 2017, the design does not appear on the Federal Aviation Administration's list of approved special light-sport aircraft.

== Operational history ==
In May 2014 no examples were registered in the United States with the Federal Aviation Administration.

== Specifications (GS-240) ==
Data from All-Aero

General characteristics

- Crew: one
- Capacity: one passenger
- Empty weight: 341 kg (752 lb)
- Gross weight: 599 kg (1,321 lb)
- Powerplant: 1 × piston aircraft engine
- Propellers: 3-bladed composite

Performance

- Cruise speed: 193 km/h (120 mph, 104 kn)
- Stall speed: 64 km/h (40 mph, 35 kn)
- Never exceed speed: 225 km/h (140 mph, 121 kn)
- Maximum glide ratio: 14:1
- Rate of climb: 4 m/s (790 ft/min)
