= Ibis Aircraft =

Colombian manufacturer of light aircraft, founded 1990

Ibis Aircraft S.A.
- Company type: Privately held company
- Industry: Aerospace
- Founded: 1 November 1990
- Headquarters: Cali, Colombia
- Products: Light-sport aircraft
- Website: ibis-aircraft.com

Ibis Aircraft S.A. is a Colombian aircraft manufacturer based in Santiago de Cali. The company specializes in the design and manufacture of light aircraft in the form of ready-to-fly aircraft for the American light-sport aircraft category, and the European Fédération Aéronautique Internationale microlight category.

The company was formed on 1 November 1990 as Ultralivianos Ibis Ltda, but on 1 June 2006 changed its name to Ibis Aircraft S.A. to present a more international image.

The company produces a range of two seat high wing monoplane light sport aircraft. The Ibis GS-700 Magic has a European microlight version.

The Ibis GS-750 Grand Magic is a four-seat development of the same basic design powered by engines of 180 to 210 hp (130 to 160 kW). The design was commenced in 2006 and was under development in 2011.

== Aircraft ==
Summary of aircraft built by Ibis Aircraft
Model name	First flight	Number built	Type
Ibis I			single seat low-wing aircraft
Ibis II			twin-engined aircraft
Ibis Cañaveral			single seat agricultural aircraft
Ibis Millenuim [sic?]			Two seat light-sport aircraft
Ibis Alaraban			Two seat light aircraft powered by a Lycoming O-235
Ibis GS-240			Two seat light-sport aircraft
Ibis GS-501 Urraco	2000	58 (2010)	Two seat light-sport and microlight aircraft
Ibis GS-600 Arrow			Two seat light-sport and microlight aircraft
Ibis GS-700 Magic	2003	102 Magics of all versions (May 2011)	Two seat light-sport and microlight aircraft
Ibis GS-710 Magic			Two seat light-sport and microlight aircraft
Ibis GS-730 Super Magic	2007		Two seat light-sport and microlight aircraft
Ibis GS-750 Grand Magic	2006		Four seat light aircraft
