= NightLife Reference Screen and City Planner Accessories =

NightLife Reference Screen and City Planner Accessories is a 1991 role-playing supplement for NightLife published by Stellar Games.

== Contents ==
NightLife Reference Screen and City Planner Accessories is a supplement in which the reference screen and character sheets come with a mini-adventure and adventure ideas.

== Reception ==
Christopher Earley reviewed NightLife Reference Screen and City Planner Accessories in White Wolf #33 (Sept./Oct., 1992), rating it a 3 out of 5 and stated that "Overall, two fine NightLife accessories (sheets and screen). Only the weak mini-adventure and that pesky matter of value-for-the-price prevent a '4' rating."
