= Magico =

Magico or Mágico may refer to:

== Arts and entertainment ==
- Magico (manga), a Japanese manga series
- Mágico (album), an album by Charlie Haden
- Mágico: Carta de Amor, an album by Jan Garbarek, Egberto Gismonti and Charlie Haden
- Mr. Magico, member of the musical group Gwar
- Magico Vento, title character of the Italian comic book of the same name

== People ==
- Mágico González (born 1958), Salvadorean former footballer nicknamed El Mágico (The Magical One)
- Kim Ho-chul (born 1955), South Korean former volleyball player and head coach nicknamed "magico"

== See also ==
- Magic (disambiguation)
- Magica (disambiguation)
- Magico-religious
