= Magic, Inc. (think tank) =

Educational think tank

Magic, Inc. is an intentional community, "educational think tank," and public service organization in Palo Alto, California co-founded by David Schrom to explore and promote the application of scientific principles to questions of value, or Valuescience. It has received recognition for its conservationist, community service, and educational contributions, and Stanford University has provided a course in Valuescience through Magic since 1979.

== History ==
Magic grew out of David Schrom's dissatisfaction with his life and its "underpinnings," as he phrases it, as a senior at Yale University in 1968. After attending Yale Law School, he worked in a variety of jobs but remained "really disgusted" by the "immorality, dishonesty and pointlessness of what he was doing." In 1972, he and a group of friends who were "camping out in life - home was a backpack or a van or a gym lockers (sic)" decided to rent a post office box to keep in touch with each other, and when the clerk informed them that unrelated individuals could not rent a box together but that an organization could, Schrom picked the name Magic on the spur of the moment. When Schrom and others incorporated in 1979, they decided to keep the name. Schrom moved to Palo Alto in 1973; the group rented their first house together in 1975; since 1988 Magic has been located on Oxford Avenue, currently in three houses.

=== Structure ===
Permanent residents and interns, sometimes called Magicians, live on donations and income from programs such as teaching, make decisions cooperatively, including whether to have children, and eat dinner together. The community practices frugal and ecologically sound living, with no cars or televisions, wearing secondhand clothes and eating a primarily vegetarian diet including organic food past its sale cut-off date donated by local businesses. Smoking and drugs are not allowed in the houses, and members avoid "psychoactive substances" including alcohol and caffeine.

== Ideology ==
Valuescience, the philosophy behind Magic, is defined by the group as "scientific methods and principles applied to questions of value." Or as Hilary Hug, a Magic resident, told an interviewer from Stanford Magazine in 2004, "We call it an ecological approach to value. We’re aiming to apply the scientific method - questioning, observing, reasoning, testing, repeating - to look at, 'What do we want? What’s important to us?'"

The organization's website describes its mission as working "in a radical, integrated, scientific way to increase human satisfaction and reduce human suffering," since they regard dissatisfaction and suffering as rooted "in misinformation about value - about what people want, how to get it, and most importantly, how we can know these things."

Since 1979, Schrom and other Magic members have taught an evolving class on Valuescience at Stanford University.

== Activism ==
Schrom and Magic have been involved in local and national ecological activism, both independently and in association with other groups. Thirty years ago, partly in gratitude to the university, Schrom started planting trees on Stanford's property in the Palo Alto foothills, and was eventually hired to manage it with volunteer labor.

== Reception ==
Stanford has given Magic an award for public service; other awards the group has received include one from the International Oaks Society for work on the impact of climate change, one from the Journal of Arboriculture for urban forest planning, one for mediation and community development from the American Society of Landscape Architects, and one for swimming instruction from New Zealand Triathlete.

== See also ==
- Value science

== Bibliography ==
- Holbrook, Stett (2009-12-02). "Magic vs. Illusion". Metro Silicon Valley. San Jose: Metro Newspapers. pp. 14–23.
