= Metta Permadi =

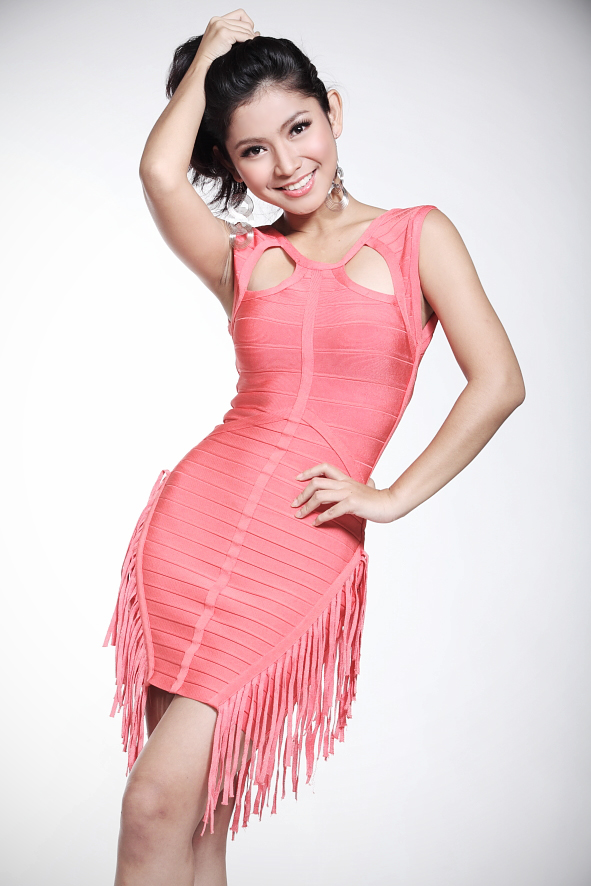
- Born: April 11, 1989 (age 36); Jakarta, Indonesia
- Occupation: Actress
- Parent(s): Ahim Permadi; Lanida Haryono

Metta Permadi (born April 11, 1989) is an Indonesian soap-opera actress of Chinese descent. She is the only child of Ahim Permadi and Lanida Haryono.

== Career ==
Permadi's career in entertainment started in 2003 when she auditioned for a teen model magazine while she was in junior high school. She passed initial selection, and reached the top 40 models.

== Filmography ==
=== Film ===
Year	Title	Notes
2014	Taman Langsat Mayestik	Lead role

== Video clip ==
Year	Title	Artist
2007	"Tentang Bintang"	Kangen Band
2009	"Jangan Menangis Untukku"	Luvia Band
