= Microsegregation =

Microsegregation is a non-uniform chemical separation and concentration of elements or impurities in alloys after they have solidified.
