= Multi-Agency Geographic Information for the Countryside =

Multi-Agency Geographic Information for the Countryside (MAGIC) is a governmental website in the United Kingdom which provides geographic information, in map form.

Launched in 2002, the site originally only had information for rural areas in England but it has grown to include information on a wide range of landscape and environmental designations in England, Wales and Scotland, and cover urban areas and the marine shelf. One of the aims to is to streamline information collection and dissemination, so reducing cost to the state.

Following a re-launch in 2013 the service is managed by Natural England. Partner organizations are the Department for Environment, Food and Rural Affairs, the Environment Agency, the Forestry Commission, Historic England and the Marine Management Organisation.

== See also ==
- Geographical Information Systems
- Town and country planning in the United Kingdom
