= Magic (NightLife) =

Magic is a 1990 role-playing supplement for Nightlife published by Stellar Games.

== Contents ==
Magic is a supplement in which a comprehensive magic system is offered along with additional content for the City Planner's New York horror campaign. The supplement introduces a new character type, the Sorcerer, which provides human PCs as viable alternatives to the monster races known as Kin. Magic in the game is categorized into Black, White, and Street magic, each drawing energy from different sources. The book also introduces NPC classes like the Witch and the Crowley, an occult scholar. Spells range from traditional horror effects to modern urban and splatter-related spells. The supplement covers new NPC races, factions, government bodies, gangs, and popular Kin music and musicians. It includes a section on the life stages of the Kin and details on Target Alpha, a group of technology-wielding humans aiming to subjugate extranaturals.

== Publication history ==
Magic: Sorcerers, Witches, Cults and Organizations is a perfect-bound 96 page book, and was the first supplement that Stellar Games published for Nightlife.

== Reception ==
Christopher Earley reviewed Magic: Magic: Sorcerers, Witches, Cults and Organizations in White Wolf #28 (Aug./Sept., 1991), rating it a 3 out of 5 and stated that "Not a sterling tribute to necessity from cover to cover, but all in all, a fine bunch of material to throw into a prospective Night Life campaign. They haven't come up with a fix for the 'shallowness' problem mentioned in [a previous review for the game], but they have made playing shallow a bit more fun."

== Reviews ==
- GamesMaster International (Issue 7 - Feb 1991)
- Ashen News (Issue 1 - Jul 1991)
- C64 Fun #4
