= WLXN =

- Lexington, North Carolina; United States
- Broadcast area: Piedmont Triad
- Frequency: 1440 kHz

Programming
- Format: Southern gospel
- Affiliations: Positive Alternative Radio

Ownership
- Owner: Positive Alternative Radio, Inc.

History
- First air date: September 22, 1946
- Former call signs: WBUY (1946-1984)
- Call sign meaning: Lexington

Technical information
- Licensing authority: FCC
- Facility ID: 15838
- Class: D
- Power: 5,300 watts day; 50 watts night
- Transmitter coordinates: 35°55′13.5″N 80°15′1.18″W
- Translators: 99.9 W260BG (Lexington); 106.1 W291DD (Lexington)

Links
- Public license information: Public file; LMS

WLXN (1440 AM) is a radio station broadcasting a southern gospel format. Licensed to Lexington, North Carolina, United States, it serves the Piedmont Triad area. The station is owned by Positive Alternative Radio, Inc. Its programming is also simulcast on translators W260BG (99.9 FM) and W291DD (106.1 FM).

== History ==
Originally, this station was called WBUY. In 1984, when co-owned WLXN-FM became WKOQ, the AM became WLXN and played southern gospel and later soft adult contemporary music; then WLXN changed to news/talk.

In 2010, several months after co-owned Majic 94.1 dropped oldies, that station's web site announced oldies were returning, on WLXN. The change took place on February 28, 2011.

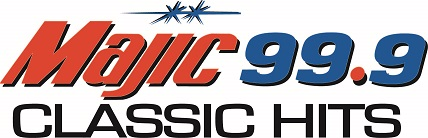
Logo as "Majic 99.9"

On November 19, 2014, WLXN rebranded as "Majic 99.9". The station also switched from Kool Gold to Tom Kent's 24/7 FUN. Max McGann and Ralph Shaw continued hosting the morning show until August 2015. The AM tower moved to the northern part of Davidson County, and the FM translator received a signal increase. In January 2016, Willie Edwards and Corie Odden took over the morning show. Following Odden's departure in mid-2016, Leanne Petty joined Edwards on Majic Mornings in October.

In 2020, WLXN switched to a simulcast of WWLV HD2's Air1. As of March 9, the local paper quoted Gig Hilton, owner and president of Davidson County Broadcasting, who said, "There is a planned format change coming to WLXN-AM in the near future. The date and time has not been defined, as there are certain contractual program obligations that must be fulfilled first. However there is no sale pending."

WLXN's web site says that on August 5, 2022, Davidson County Broadcasting filed with the FCC for "consent of assignment of license to Positive Alternative Radio, Incorporated". The station's format has changed to southern gospel. The sale of WLXN and translator W291DD was consummated on December 29, 2022, at a price of $348,368.

== Translators ==
| Call sign | Frequency | City of license | FID | ERP (W) | Class | Transmitter coordinates | FCC info |
|---|---|---|---|---|---|---|---|
| W260BG | 99.9 FM | Lexington, North Carolina | 148853 | 250 | D | 35°55′2.5″N 80°17′37.2″W | LMS |
| W291DD | 106.1 FM | Lexington, North Carolina | 138258 | 250 | D | 36°5′25.1″N 80°15′5.1″W | LMS |
