= Ibis GS-700 Magic =

Colombian ultralight aircraft

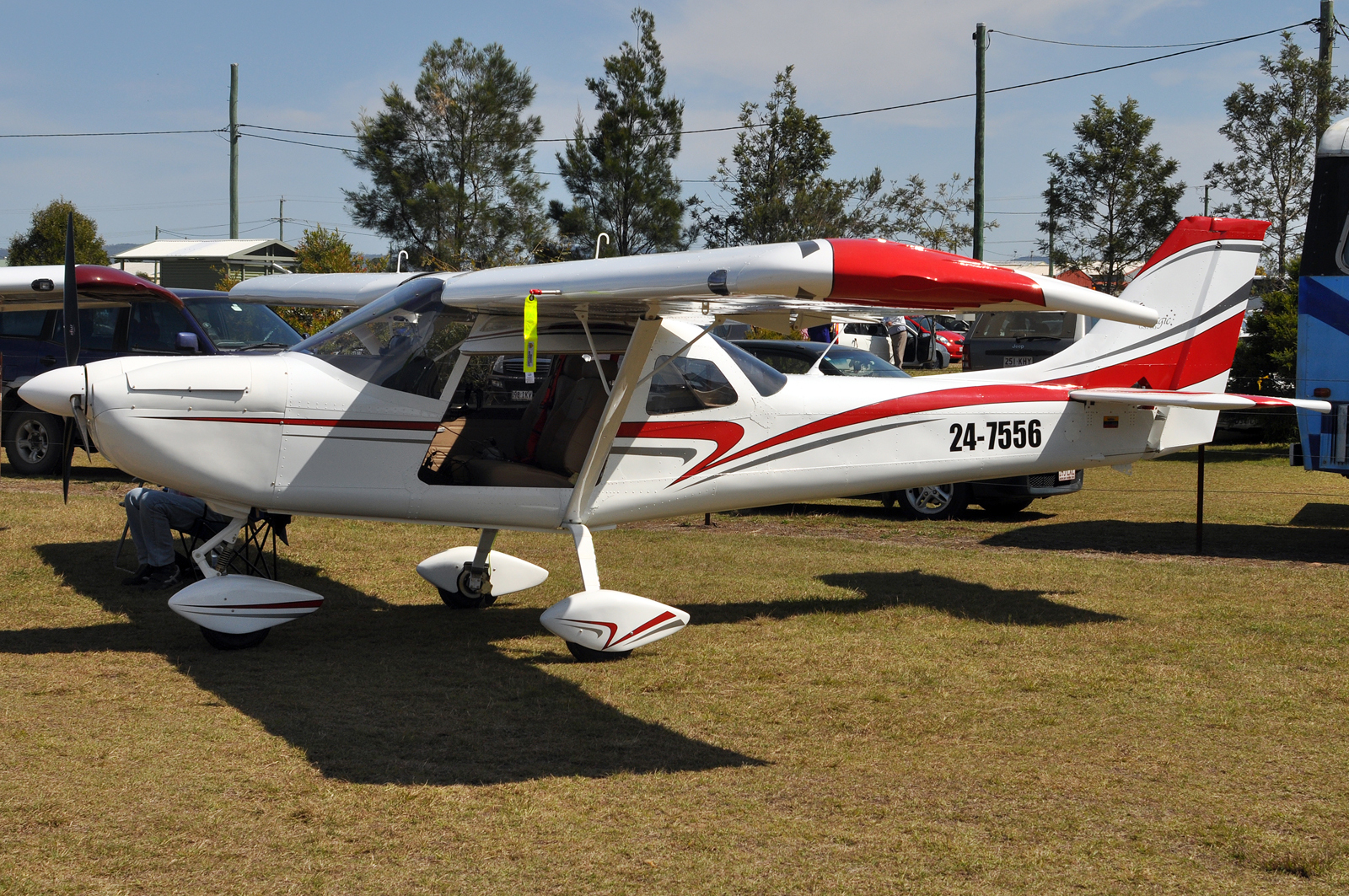

General information
- Type: Ultralight aircraft and Light-sport aircraft
- National origin: Colombia
- Manufacturer: Ibis Aircraft
- Status: In production (2015)

History
- Introduction date: 2003
- Variants: Ibis GS-710 Magic; Ibis GS-750 Grand Magic

The Ibis GS-700 Magic is a Colombian ultralight and light-sport aircraft, designed and produced by Ibis Aircraft of Cali, introduced in 2003. The aircraft is supplied as a kit for amateur construction or as a complete ready-to-fly-aircraft.

== Design and development ==
The Magic was designed to comply with the Fédération Aéronautique Internationale microlight rules and US light-sport aircraft rules, with different models for each category. It features a strut-braced high-wing, a two-seats-in-side-by-side configuration enclosed cockpit, fixed tricycle landing gear and a single engine in tractor configuration. The Magic strongly resembles the Cessna 150.

The aircraft is made from sheet 6061-T6 aluminum. Its 8.85 m (29.0 ft) span wing has an area of 12.48 m^{2} (134.3 sq ft) and mounts flaps. The standard engine available is the 100 hp (75 kW) Rotax 912ULS four-stroke powerplant. The Magic was designed to use rough, unimproved airstrips.

A total of 102 Magics of all versions had been built by May 2011.

== Variants ==
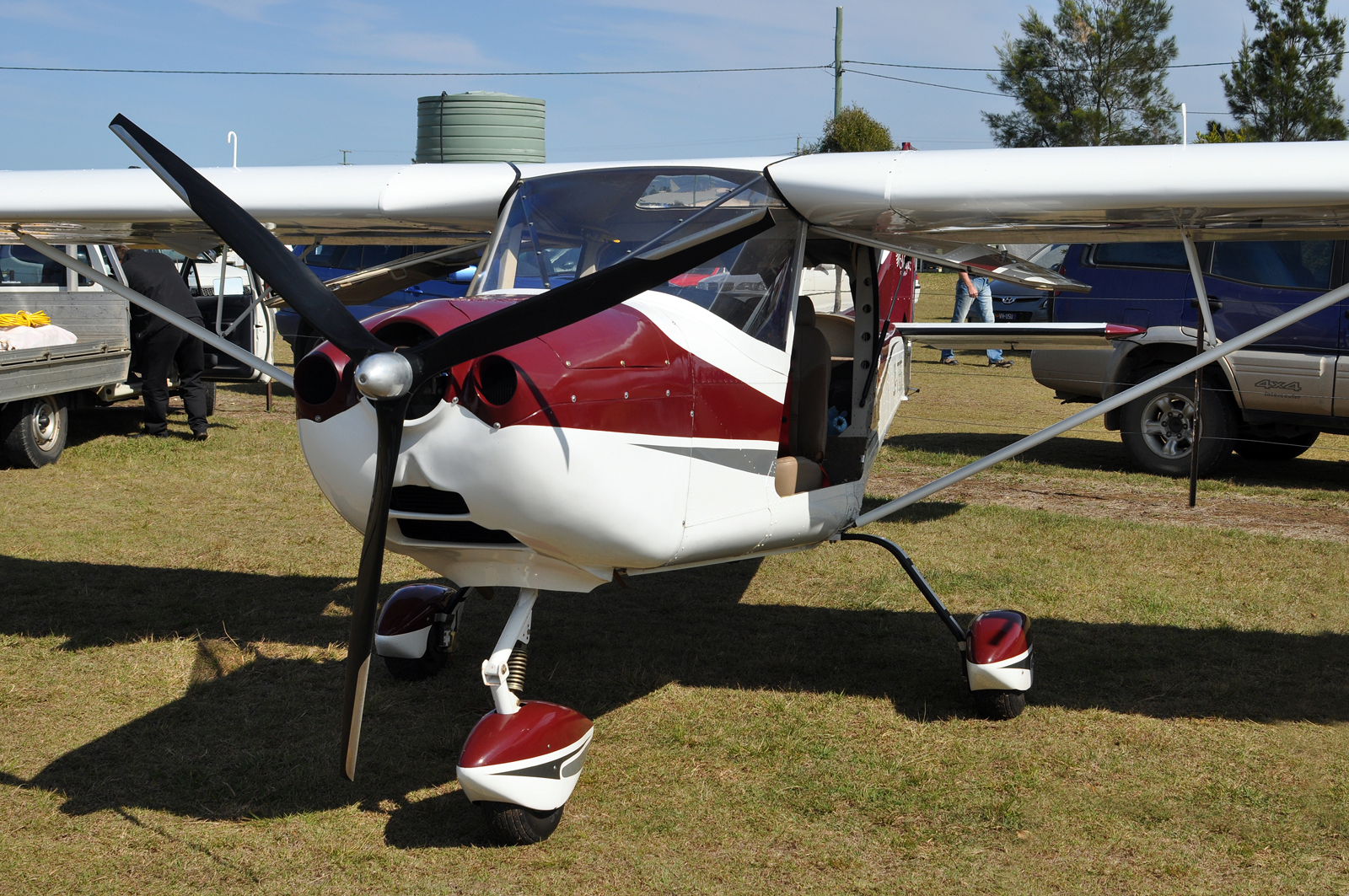
Ibis GS-700 Magic

GS-700
Base model for the Latin American market with a 700 kg (1,543 lb) gross weight and optional Junkers ailerons and leading edge slats. It was Australian Recreational Aviation Australia certified on 16 April 2009 at 570 kg (1,257 lb) gross weight.
GS-700 LSA
Model for the US LSA category with a 600 kg (1,323 lb) gross weight.
GS-700 ULM (also called LV)
Model for the European microlight category with a 450 kg (992 lb) gross weight.

== Specifications (GS-700 LSA) ==
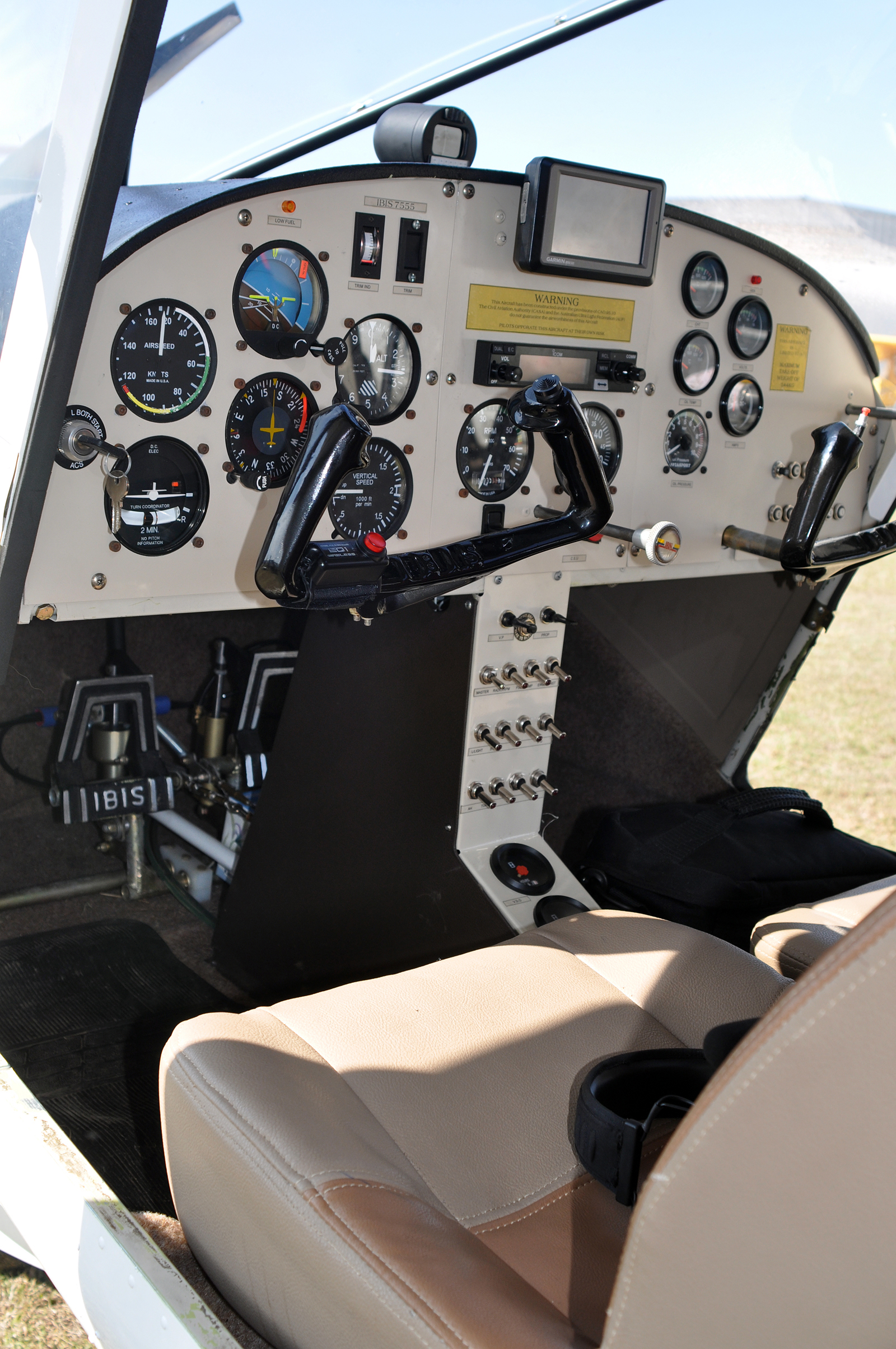
Ibis GS-700 Magic instrument panel

Data from Bayerl, Tacke and Ibis Aircraft

General characteristics

- Crew: one
- Capacity: one passenger
- Length: 6.85 m (22 ft 6 in)
- Wingspan: 8.55 m (28 ft 1 in)
- Height: 2.18 m (7 ft 2 in)
- Wing area: 12.48 m^{2} (134.3 sq ft)
- Aspect ratio: 6.4
- Empty weight: 320 kg (705 lb)
- Gross weight: 600 kg (1,323 lb)
- Fuel capacity: 75 litres (16 imp gal; 20 US gal)
- Powerplant: 1 × Rotax 912ULS four cylinder, liquid and air-cooled, four stroke aircraft engine, 75 kW (101 hp)
- Propellers: 3-bladed Ivoprop

Performance

- Maximum speed: 195 km/h (121 mph, 105 kn)
- Cruise speed: 185 km/h (115 mph, 100 kn)
- Stall speed: 57 km/h (35 mph, 31 kn) flaps down
- Never exceed speed: 209 km/h (130 mph, 113 kn)
- Service ceiling: 3,600 m (11,800 ft)
- g limits: +4/-2
- Rate of climb: 5 m/s (980 ft/min)
- Wing loading: 45.7 kg/m^{2} (9.4 lb/sq ft)
