= Animal perception of magic =

Technique in psychology

Researchers study the reactions of animals observing humans performing magic tricks in order to better understand animal cognition. Using these studies, evolutionary psychologists aim to gain insights into the evolution of perception and attention by comparing responses of different species, including humans.

== Background ==
Magic is about violating expectations. It capitalises on specific blind spots in attention and perception. While scientific interest in humans' perception of magic dates back to the late 19th century, when in 1896 Alfred Binet presented his work, this faded quickly, and has only recently, in the early 21st century, been revived. Some researchers have coined terms such as neuromagic or magicology for the study of magic. Other scientists are critical of the new field, saying it is not worthy to stand as a field of its own. Scientists aim to get insight into how the human mind operates.

Some animal species are capable of misdirection, an important skill magicians possess to trick humans. For example, chimpanzees have been observed to deliberately look away from an object they desire as to avoid it being noticed by a competitor. Jays and other corvids pretend to store food in various places, trying to obscure the cache's true location from observers. This suggests that at least some species are susceptible to magic.

== Overview ==
In an article in Science in 2020, researchers Garcia-Pelegrin, Schnell, Wilkins, and Clayton made the case for using magic in the study of animal cognition. They argued that it offers a new way for hypothesis testing and experimental design. Their central research questions are: can a magic trick that deceives humans fool animals as well? If so, how? Various practical challenges exist to answer these questions. Attention control is a key component of many magic tricks and getting the animal to pay attention to a human can be difficult and might limit the range of species and magic tricks that can be used in studies. A further challenge is how to assess if the magic trick worked or not. In the absence of verbalisations researchers have to look for behavioural responses indicating whether the animal has been tricked or not. In humans, successful magic tricks elicit an emotional response of surprise. Researchers assume that a relatively long time of looking at an object or situation is an indication of the animal being surprised by what happened.

Known cognitive skills, such as the ability to grasp object permanence, that is, the ability to represent objects in the mind's eye when the object is out of sight, can inspire the researchers which tricks to perform on which species. Animals that cache their food seem suitable subjects for tricks exploiting blind spots in object permanence.

By studying nonhuman animals' perception of magic, we can gain insights into the evolution of the cognitive skills magicians exploit.

== Results ==
=== Jays ===
Schnell et al. found evidence in a 2021 study that jays are sensitive to magic. They used the cups and balls routine to trick the birds. In a second study they performed three magic tricks, palming, the French drop, and fast pass, on six jays. The birds were not deceived by the palming and French drop tricks, but were deceived by the fast pass. The first two techniques depend on human hand movements setting expectations for an object moving from one place to another. These hand movements did not trick the jays. But fast hand movements did mislead them.
