= WWLV =

- Lexington, North Carolina; United States
- Broadcast area: Piedmont Triad
- Frequency: 94.1 MHz (HD Radio)
- Branding: K-LOVE

Programming
- Format: Contemporary Christian
- Subchannels: HD2: Air1; HD3: K-LOVE Eras; HD4: Spanish Christian "La Verdad Winston-Salem"
- Network: K-Love

Ownership
- Owner: Educational Media Foundation; (K-LOVE Inc.)

History
- First air date: 1940s (as WBUY-FM)
- Former call signs: WBUY-FM (1940s-1970s); WLXN (1970s-1984); WBUY (1984–1985); WKOQ (4/1/1985-4/4/1988); WWGL (4/4/1988-12/26/2000); WTHZ (12/26/2000-3/25/2010)
- Call sign meaning: LoVe - in reference to K-LOVE

Technical information
- Licensing authority: FCC
- Facility ID: 15839
- Class: C
- ERP: 100,000 watts
- HAAT: 309 meters (1,014 ft)
- Transmitter coordinates: 35°55′2″N 80°17′37″W
- Translators: HD2: 88.9 W205CP (Winston-Salem); HD4: 96.3 W242CC (Bethania)

Links
- Public license information: Public file; LMS
- Webcast: Listen Live; Listen Live (HD2); Listen Live (HD3)
- Website: klove.com air1.com (HD2)

WWLV (94.1 FM) is a radio station licensed to Lexington, North Carolina, and serving the Piedmont Triad metropolitan area. The station is an affiliate of K-LOVE.

== History ==
94.1 began in the early 1940s as WBUY-FM by Davidson County Broadcasting as a simulcast partner of their AM station WBUY at 1440 on the dial. By the early-1970s separate calls of WLXN were acquired for the FM station but it remained simulcast with WBUY until 1976, when the station would break away from the simulcast at certain times during the day to air Christian programming. WLXN's programming had become largely separate from that of WBUY by late 1983. On January 1, 1984, the Christian programming and WLXN call letters were transferred to the AM station and the WBUY call letters came to the FM, which then initiated a country music format. In April 1985 WBUY-FM changed call letters to WKOQ("Q-94") and continued the country format, increasing its power to cover the entire Greensboro-Winston-Salem-High Point market. In 1988 WKOQ became WWGL ("We Witness God's Love"), a Christian radio station which emphasized southern gospel music and later Contemporary Christian. Another signal boost was made several years later when WWGL built a new, taller tower north of Lexington, shared with WFDD. The tower was supposed to have taken 18 months to complete, but a station at 94.5 FM kept protesting that its signal would be affected. Once it was determined that would not be a problem, the tower was built and put into operation September 29, 1994.

In 2000, the station began calling itself WTHZ ("Hitz 94"), playing mostly 1980s' music. The station eventually evolved to a Hot AC format, still using the "Hitz 94" name, with the slogan "The 80s, 90s, and Now."

The station began the oldies format (music from roughly 1964-1984) in November 2006 after local Entercom oldies outlet WMQX flipped to country music. First calling itself "Your Station for the Oldies", then "the Best of the '60s, '70s and '80s", Majic 94.1 later used "The Carolinas' Greatest Hits" with a very large playlist primarily of the 1960s to 1980s top 40 songs. In the early and mid-2000s, it was the Triad affiliate of the Tar Heel Sports Network.

On March 14, 2010; the station began leasing its frequency to the Educational Media Foundation, who switched the station to K-LOVE. Station owner Gig Hilton said advertisers were unwilling to buy time on the station because it attracted an older demographic, and the big companies who owned several stations could offer cheaper advertising rates. The recession made the deal from Educational Media Foundation very attractive. Hilton did say switching back to oldies would be considered if the situation changed or if he was able to move the transmitter closer to Charlotte (see below). He also said that many listeners had complained. The station's call letters were changed to WWLV to better reflect its new format in late March 2010.

In 2013, Bible Broadcasting Network requested a translator at 93.9 FM.

On February 14, 2014, the station was sold outright to EMF at a purchase price of $10,507,985.

== Tower controversy ==
Due to its location in Lexington, roughly halfway between Charlotte and Greensboro, WWLV's signal covers roughly three-fourths of both the Charlotte and Triad markets. It easily covers the northern portion of the Charlotte market (including Statesville, Mooresville, Kannapolis and Albemarle), and provides at least grade B coverage of most of Charlotte itself. As WTHZ, it acquired a fairly loyal following in the northern portion of the Charlotte market, which hasn't had a full-market oldies station since WWMG-FM (Magic 96.1) flipped to CHR as WIBT.

During the latter part of its ownership, Davidson County Broadcasting worked to build a tower in western Rowan County in Salisbury, which is part of the Charlotte market. It also applied to move its city of license to Faith. This location would significantly improve its coverage in Charlotte, but it would presumably still be reckoned as a Triad-market station.

Hilton proposed to build a 1,350-foot (410 m) tower in Mount Ulla, 5 mi (8,000 m) east of Mooresville. However, in 2005, Rowan County commissioners rejected a conditional use permit for the tower due to concerns that the tower would pose a safety hazard to Miller Airpark, a nearby private air strip. Several pilots, as well as a state aviation official, said the tower would cause problems for the airplanes landing and taking off. While the Federal Aviation Administration found "determination of no hazard," the FAA only had authority over public airports. The Rowan County Superior Court upheld the rejection in June 2006, and the North Carolina Court of Appeals also agreed with the county in 2007. Hilton claimed that the private air strip was given more favorable treatment than a public airport.

Richard L. and Dorcas Parker, owners of the property where the tower would be located, offered free space on the tower for county emergency communications, but in February 2009 county telecommunications director Rob Robinson said the tower would not give the area the coverage needed. Planning director Ed Muire said the communications equipment would not exempt the tower from the usual zoning procedures. On May 19, the county zoning board of adjustment ruled Muire was correct.

The Parkers requested that 18 acres (73,000 m^{2}) of their farm be annexed by Mooresville, which declined on March 1, 2010 to do so. However, most of the county commissioners who turned down a conditional use permit in 2005 were replaced, and Hilton decided to try again. This time, he was requesting a 1,200-foot (370 m) tower, which Davidson County Broadcasting intended to show has been declared "no hazard" by the FAA. After three days of hearings in August 2011, county commissioners approved the tower. According to the FCC construction permit, the station would have to reduce its power to 43,000 watts as a result, with a signal favoring Charlotte more than Greensboro. However, the license would remain in Lexington.

The Miller Air Park Association appealed the decision, along with several private citizens concerned that the tower would threaten the area's rural character. In September 2012, Rowan County Superior Court judge W. David Lee ruled that the change in tower height was not enough to justify revisiting the matter, meaning that the county will have to dismiss the application. Lee pointed out that at the original hearing, concerns had been raised that any tower higher than 650 ft (200 m) would pose a safety hazard. County commissioners voted to appeal the decision. An appeals court upheld the ruling February 18, 2014. A month later, commissioners voted not to take further action.

In October 2013, Hilton dropped his application for a 1,190-foot (360 m) tower because of some missing information that would allow a decision in his favor to be appealed. He said he would apply again once the missing information was added. On January 23, 2014, the Iredell County Zoning Board of Adjustment turned down a special use permit for an 1,190-foot (360 m) tower in Iredell County.
