= Ivoprop =

American aircraft propellor manufacturer

- Industry: Aerospace
- Founded: 1984
- Founder: Ivo Zdarsky
- Headquarters: Long Beach, California, United States
- Products: Aircraft propellers

Ivoprop Corporation, founded in 1984 by Ivo Zdarsky, is an American manufacturer of composite propellers for homebuilt and ultralight aircraft, as well as airboats. The company's headquarters are in Long Beach, California.

Zdarsky started the company after carving his own propeller for a homebuilt ultralight trike that he flew to escape from Cold War Czechoslovakia, over the Iron Curtain to Vienna in 1984. Ivoprop has sold more than 20,000 propellers since then.

The company's propellers are built from carbon-fiber-reinforced polymer and feature a stainless steel leading edge.

== Ivoprop variable-pitch propeller ==
Ivoprop produce both in-flight adjustable and ground-adjustable propellers of unusual design. Whereas conventional variable-pitch propellers rotate at the blade root, the Ivoprop design has the blade root firmly clamped to the hub. The blade is hollow, containing a steel torsion rod fixed to the blade tip. By mechanically turning the rod within the hub, a twist is achieved which adjusts the blade's angle of attack.

== See also ==
- List of aircraft propeller manufacturers
