= 7075 aluminium alloy =

Type of aluminium-zinc alloy

A7075 T6
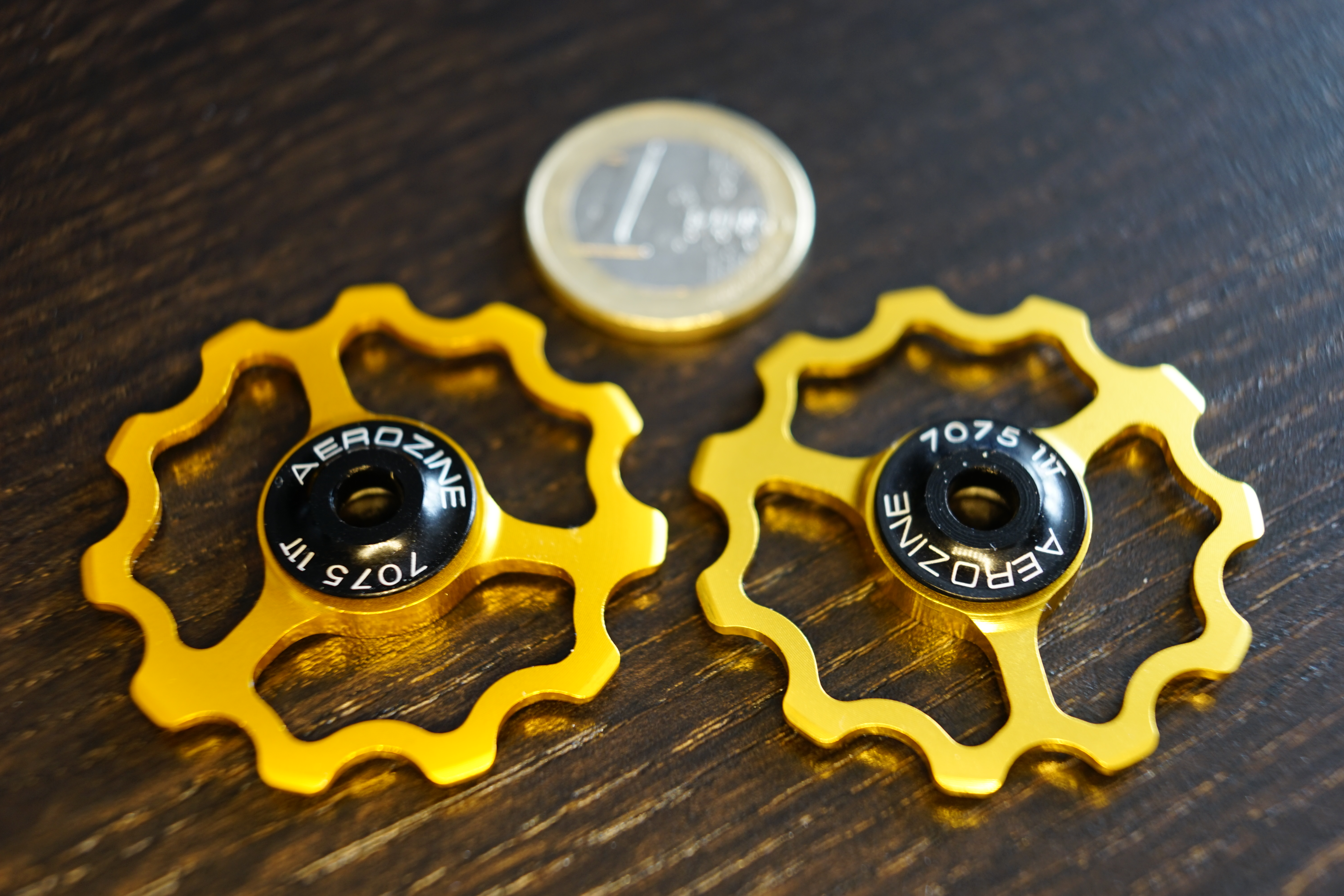
- Pulley wheels for a bicycle rear derailleur made of 7075 aluminium alloy

Physical properties
- Density (ρ): 2.81 g/cm^{3} (0.102 lb/cu in)

Mechanical properties
- Young's modulus (E): 71.7 GPa (10,400 ksi)
- Tensile strength (σ_{t}): 572 MPa (83.0 ksi)
- Elongation (ε) at break: 11%
- Poisson's ratio (ν): 0.33
- Hardness—Rockwell: 87 HRB

Thermal properties
- Melting temperature (T_{m}): 477 °C (891 °F)
- Thermal conductivity (k): 130–150 W/m⋅K
- Linear thermal expansion coefficient (α): 2.36×10^{−5} K^{−1}
- Specific heat capacity (c): 714.8 J/kg⋅K

Electrical properties
- Volume resistivity (ρ): 51.5 nOhm⋅m

7075 aluminium alloy (AA7075) is an aluminium alloy with zinc as the primary alloying element. It has excellent mechanical properties and exhibits good ductility and resistance to fatigue as well as high strength and toughness. It is more susceptible to embrittlement than many other aluminium alloys because of microsegregation, but has significantly better corrosion resistance than the alloys from the 2000 series. It is one of the most commonly used aluminium alloys for highly stressed structural applications and has been extensively used in aircraft structural parts.

7075 aluminium alloy's composition includes roughly 5.6–6.1% zinc, 2.1–2.5% magnesium, 1.2–1.6% copper, and less than a half percent of silicon, iron, manganese, titanium, chromium, and other metals. It is produced in many tempers, some of which are 7075-0, 7075-T6, 7075-T651.

The first 7075 was developed by a Japanese company, Sumitomo Metal, in 1935, and eventually used for airframe production in the Imperial Japanese Navy. 7075 was reverse engineered by Alcoa in 1943, after examining a captured Japanese aircraft. 7075 was standardized for aerospace use in 1945.

== Basic properties ==
Aluminium 7075A has a density of 2.810 g/cm^{3}.

== Mechanical properties ==
The mechanical properties of 7075 depend greatly on the tempering of the material.

Aluminium 7075 has a low formability at low room temperature and is vulnerable to stress corrosion cracking. Using different elevated temperature forming techniques including Hot Form Quench (HFQ) has been shown to reduce springback and fracture. Examples of those elevated temperature forming techniques are retrogression forming and warm forming.

=== 7075-O ===
Un-heat-treated 7075 (7075-0 temper) has a maximum tensile strength of no more than 280 MPa (40,000 psi), and maximum yield strength of no more than 140 MPa (21,000 psi). The material has an elongation (stretch before ultimate failure) of 9–10%. As is the case for all 7075 aluminium alloys, 7075-0 is highly corrosion-resistant combined with generally acceptable strength profile.

=== 7075-T6 ===
T6 temper 7075 has an ultimate tensile strength of 510–540 MPa (74,000–78,000 psi) and yield strength of at least 430–480 MPa (63,000–69,000 psi). It has a failure elongation of 5–11%.

The T6 temper is usually achieved by homogenizing the cast 7075 at 450 °C for several hours, quenching, and then ageing at 120 °C for 24 hours. This yields the peak strength of the 7075 alloys. The strength is derived mainly from finely dispersed eta and eta' precipitates both within grains and along grain boundaries.

=== 7075-T651 ===
T651 temper 7075 has an ultimate tensile strength of 570 MPa (83,000 psi) and yield strength of 500 MPa (73,000 psi). It has a failure elongation of 3–9%. These properties can change depending on the form of material used. The thicker plates may exhibit lower strengths and elongation than the numbers listed above.

=== 7075-T7 ===
T7 temper has an ultimate tensile strength of 505 MPa (73,200 psi) and a yield strength of 435 MPa (63,100 psi). It has a failure elongation of 13%. T7 temper is achieved by overaging (meaning aging past the peak hardness) the material. This is often accomplished by aging at 100–120 °C for several hours and then at 160–180 °C for 24 hours or more. The T7 temper produces a microstructure of mostly eta precipitates. In contrast to the T6 temper, these eta particles are much larger and prefer growth along the grain boundaries. This reduces the susceptibility to stress corrosion cracking. T7 temper is equivalent to T73 temper.

=== 7075-RRA ===
The retrogression and reage (RRA) temper is a multistage heat treatment temper. Starting with a sheet in the T6 temper, it involves overaging past peak hardness (T6 temper) to near the T7 temper. A subsequent reaging at 120 °C for 24 hours returns the hardness and strength to or very nearly to T6 temper levels.

RRA treatments can be accomplished with many different procedures. The general guidelines are retrogressing between 180 and 240 °C for 15 min 10 s.

== Equivalent materials ==
Table of equivalent materials
US		ISO		European Union		Germany		Japan		Australia		China		Russia	
Standard	AISI (UNS)	Standard	Designation	Standard	Numerical (Chemical symbols)	Standard	Designation (Material number)	Standard	Grade	Standard	Designation	Standard	Grade	Standard	Designation
ASTM B209, ASTM B210, ASTM B211, ASTM B221, AMS-QQ-A-225/9, AMS-QQ-A-200/11, AMS-QQ-A-250/12, AMS-WW-T-700/7	7075 (A97075)	ISO 209	AW-7075	EN 573-3	EN AW-7075 (EN AW-AlZn5,5MgCu)	DIN 1725-1	AlZnMgCu1,5 (3.4365)	JIS H4000; JIS H4040	7075	AS 2848.1, AS/NZS 1734, AS/NZS 1865, AS/NZS 1866	7075	GB/T 3190; GB/T 3880.2	7075	ГОСТ 4784-2019	В95 (В95Т1, В95Т2 etc.)

== Uses ==
The world's first mass-production usage of the 7075 aluminium alloy was for the Mitsubishi A6M Zero fighter. The aircraft was known for its excellent maneuverability which was facilitated by the higher strength of 7075 compared to previous aluminium alloys.

7000 series alloys such as 7075 are often used in transport applications due to their high specific strength, including marine, automotive and aviation. These same properties lead to its use in rock climbing equipment, bicycle components, inline-skating-frames and hang glider airframes are commonly made from 7075 aluminium alloy. Hobby-grade RC models commonly use 7075 and 6061 for chassis plates. 7075 is used in the manufacturing of M16 rifles for the U.S. military as well as AR-15 style rifles for the civilian market. In particular high-quality M16 rifle lower and upper receivers, as well as extension tubes, are typically made from 7075-T6 alloy. Desert Tactical Arms, SIG Sauer, and French armament company PGM use it for their precision rifles. It is also commonly used in shafts for lacrosse sticks, such as the STX sabre, and camping knife and fork sets. It is a common material used in competition yo-yos as well.

Another application for the 7075-series alloy has been in connecting rods used in drag racing engines. Aluminium connecting rods do not have the fatigue life of forged steel rods, but have less mass than their steel counterparts, resulting in lower mechanical stress during periods in which an engine is operated under full-throttle, high-RPM conditions.

It has also been the standard material for crankcase guards on off-road motorcycles.

Due to its high strength, low density, thermal properties, and its ability to be highly polished, 7075 is widely used in mold tool manufacturing. This alloy has been further refined into other 7000 series alloys for this application, namely 7050 and 7020.

=== Aerospace applications ===
7075 was used in the Space Shuttle SRB nozzles, and the external tank SRB beam in the Inter-tank section. The forward- and aft skirt as well as the Interstage of the S-II, the second stage of the Saturn V was made from 7075.

=== Applications ===
1. Aircraft fittings
2. Gears and shafts
3. Missile parts
4. Regulating valve parts
5. Worm gears
6. Aerospace/defense applications
7. Automotive
8. Bicycle Chainrings
9. Bicycle Gearboxes
10. Archery equipment

== Trade names ==
7075 has been sold under various trade names including Zicral/Zycral, Ergal, and Fortal Constructal. Some 7000 series alloys sold under brand names for making molds include Alumec 79, Alumec 89, Contal, Certal, Alumould, and Hokotol.

== See also ==
Northwest Airlines Flight 421
