= Hoffmann Propeller =

German aircraft propeller manufacturing company

- Industry: Aerospace
- Founded: 1955
- Founder: Richard Wurm
- Headquarters: Rosenheim, Bavaria, Germany
- Products: Aircraft propellers
- Number of employees: 57
- Website: www.hoffmann-prop.com

Hoffman Propeller is a German manufacturer of aircraft propellers. The company headquarters is located at Rosenheim in Bavaria, Germany. The company makes design, manufacture and maintain propellers with blades in wooden composite construction for needed purposes, mainly for the general aviation, hovercraft and any special applications such as blades for wind tunnels the automotive industries. By the version of Aircraft Turboprop Propeller System Market Outlook, the company was one of the major market players.

== History ==
Established in 1955 the company initially designed and produced propellers for motor gliders with a staff of six. The company expanded into the field of general aviation propeller overhaul and today, with a staff of 57, the company offers a wide range of propeller services including new certified replacements for vintage aircraft where the original propeller type is unavailable.

The company has acquired rights to the V-Prop, an automatic self-powering electronic variable-pitch propeller invented by Thomas Strieker of Silence Aircraft. Stefan Bichlmeyr from Technical Engineering at Hoffmann Propeller has said that the firm is working with Thomas Strieker to redesign the VProp system for bigger engines. As of June 2013 this redesign is in process but not finished yet.

Hoffmann Propeller also manufactures fans for wind tunnels and hovercraft.

== See also ==
- List of aircraft propeller manufacturers
