= Arplast Micro'B =

French ultralight aircraft

Micro'B

General information
- Type: Ultralight aircraft
- National origin: France
- Manufacturer: Arplast Helice
- Status: Production completed

The Arplast Micro'B (English: Microbe) is a French ultralight aircraft that was designed and produced by propeller manufacturer Arplast Helice. It was supplied as a kit for amateur construction or as a complete ready-to-fly-aircraft.

== Design and development ==
The Arplast Micro'B was designed to comply with the Fédération Aéronautique Internationale microlight rules, with a lightened version for the US FAR 103 Ultralight Vehicles category. It features a strut-braced high-wing, a single-seat enclosed cockpit, fixed tricycle landing gear and a single engine in tractor configuration.

The Micro'B is made from a combination of welded steel and carbon fibre, with the flying surfaces made from the latter material. Its 8.6 m (28.2 ft) span wing is supported by a single strut per side and features automatic flaps. Standard engines included the 40 hp (30 kW) Rotax 447 two-stroke or other small lightweight motors, mounted on the main keel tube above the cockpit.

== Variants ==
Micro'B
Initial version, which was used to win the World Microlight Championships.
Micro'B ML
Improved version, with carbon fibre construction for the FAI Microlight class. Standard engine supplied was the 40 hp (30 kW) Rotax 447 two-stroke aircraft engine. Empty weight of 125 kg (276 lb).
Micro'B 103
Lightened version for the US ultralight category, equipped with a 25 hp (19 kW) Briggs & Stratton V-twin engine. Empty weight of 110 kg (243 lb).

== Specifications (Micro'B 103) ==
Data from Bayerl

General characteristics

- Crew: one
- Wingspan: 8.6 m (28 ft 3 in)
- Wing area: 8.3 m^{2} (89 sq ft)
- Empty weight: 110 kg (243 lb)
- Gross weight: 250 kg (551 lb)
- Fuel capacity: 15 litres (3.3 imp gal; 4.0 US gal)
- Powerplant: 1 × Briggs & Stratton V-twin engine, 19 kW (25 hp)

Performance

- Maximum speed: 145 km/h (90 mph, 78 kn)
- Cruise speed: 110 km/h (68 mph, 59 kn)
- Stall speed: 40 km/h (25 mph, 22 kn)
- Rate of climb: 2.5 m/s (490 ft/min)
- Wing loading: 30.12 kg/m^{2} (6.17 lb/sq ft)
