= Vari-Prop =

American aircraft propeller manufacturer

- Industry: Aerospace
- Founded: 2004
- Founder: Larry Morgan
- Defunct: 2016
- Fate: Out of business
- Headquarters: Beaverton, Oregon, United States
- Products: Aircraft propellers
- Parent: Pitch-Control Systems
- Website: variprop.com

Vari-Prop, founded in 2004 by Larry Morgan, was an American manufacturer of composite propellers for homebuilt and light-sport aircraft. The company headquarters was originally located in Cottonwood, California and later in Beaverton, Oregon.

The company's line of propellers started development in 1988 and consisted of variable-pitch, ground-adjustable and constant-speed propellers.

By 2016 the company's website was for sale and the company business seems to have been wound up.

== See also ==
- List of aircraft propeller manufacturers
