= Pacesetter =

Pacesetter may refer to:

- Pacesetter (fishing vessel), capsized January 27, 1996
- Pacesetter Ltd, a defunct company that published role-playing and board games
- Pacesetter Park in Sylvania, Ohio, United States
- Pacesetter Propeller Works, a manufacturer of aircraft propellers
- Pacemaker (running), a runner used to help establish fast racing times
- Pacesetter Systems, a defunct biotechnology company
- Pacesetter Novels, a series by African writers started in 1977
