= P & K Enterprises =

American aircraft propeller manufacturer

- Industry: Aerospace
- Fate: Out of Business
- Headquarters: Colfax, Indiana, United States
- Products: Aircraft propellers

P & K Enterprises was an American manufacturer of composite and wooden propellers for homebuilt and ultralight aircraft. The company was headquartered in Colfax, Indiana.

It built fixed-pitch and ground-adjustable propellers with two to five blades for 2si, Rotax, and Zenoah engines up to 90 hp (67 kW) from wooden laminates and composites.

== See also ==
- List of aircraft propeller manufacturers
