= Aks =

Aks or AKS may refer to:

== Arts and entertainment ==
- Aks (2001 film), a 2001 Indian Hindi supernatural thriller by Rakeysh Omprakash Mehra
- Aks (2018 film), a 2018 Pakistani horror film
- Aks (album), released by Lucky Ali in 2000
- Aks (TV series), a 2012 Pakistani drama

== Organizations ==
- Academic Karelia Society, a Finnish activist organization, 1922–1944
- Academy of Korean Studies, a South Korean research and educational institute
- Politiets Aktionsstyrke, a Danish special-task police force
- AKS Lytham, a school in Lancashire, UK

=== Companies ===
- AKS Inc, an aircraft propeller manufacturer
- AKS (company), a Japanese talent agency, headquartered in Tokyo, Japan
- AK Steel (NYSE:AKS), a US steel manufacturer

== Military ==
- Aks 13000, or Aks 13, part of the Norwegian resistance movement in World War II
- Army Kinematograph Service, a World War II British unit
- A US Navy hull classification symbol: General stores issue ship (AKS)
- AKS-47, a variant of the AK-47 assault rifle

== Science and technology ==
- Alkenylsuccinic anhydrides, used in papermaking
- Ajtai–Komlós–Szemerédi network, a sorting network algorithm
- EMS Synthi AKS, an analog synthesizer
- AKS primality test, a deterministic primality-proving algorithm
- Azure Kubernetes Service, a software product to deploy containerized applications

== Other uses ==
- Aks, a metathesis of "ask" in African American Vernacular, and other forms of English
