= V-Prop =

The V-Prop is an automatic self-powering electronic variable-pitch propeller developed by Silence Aircraft. A contra-rotating vaned spinner ahead of the main spinner both powers a microprocessor and delivers data to instruct the blades to be adjusted automatically.

The V-Prop is an automatic self-powering electronic variable-pitch propeller developed by Silence Aircraft, the manufacturers of the Silence Twister single-seat elliptical-winged kitplane.

== Design and development ==
The V-Prop was fitted to the prototype Twister and to some of the Twisters built in the EU. Designed by brothers Thomas and Mattheus Strieker, this microprocessor-controlled automatic propeller has a vaned spinner ahead of, and co-axial with, the main spinner. The main spinner is fixed to the output shaft in the normal fashion; but the vaned spinner is free to contra-rotate, and in doing so both generates its own power and derives rpm data that it uses to determine the ideal blade angle. The unit then automatically adjusts the blades between the coarse and fine positions. On the ground, the electronic control system can be tailored to suit each aircraft by varying some soldered connections, which give some 16 options.

The V-Prop has both 2-bladed and 3-bladed versions, but only for clockwise rotation (as seen from the cockpit). The advantage of the V-Prop is that it is very light and compact, it requires no exterior power source, is fail-safe, and being completely automatic, requires no pilot input.

The V-Prop has been successfully fitted to many light aircraft in Europe, including Denmark, but despite the EU's principle of free movement of goods, the LAA would not approve it for UK kit aircraft without further extensive testing.

In May 2013, Mattheus Strieker confirmed that the V-Prop went out of production some two years earlier. The design rights were sold to Hoffmann Propeller, an established propeller manufacturer in Germany. Hoffman Propeller plans to develop the V-Prop for fitment to certified aircraft as well as to kit planes. Stefan Bichlmeyr from Technical Engineering at Hoffmann Propeller has said that the firm is working with Thomas Strieker to redesign the VProp system for bigger engines.

As of June 2016 this redesign is in process but still not finished. Although the original 5kg two-bladed propeller was effective and was fitted to several European ultralights, Hoffman have suspended any further development. Instead, Hoffmann are focusing on the more lucrative certified aircraft market, and their current prototype is a five-fold heavier (25kg) three-bladed propeller for engines such as the Lycoming O-360.

== Technical data ==
Source: Silence VProp manual.

- Maximum airspeed: 300 km/h
- Maximum acceleration: +8g/−5g
- Optimum flight altitudes: 0–15,000 feet
- Flight in icing condition: Not permitted
- Flight in rain: protect blades with 3M tape
- Mass of 2-bladed propeller: 5 kg
- Mass 3-bladed propeller: 6 kg

== See also ==
- List of aircraft propeller manufacturers
- Folding propeller
