= The Falcon Airscrew Company =

Aircraft equipment manufacturer

- Industry: Aerospace
- Founder: David Morgan Davies
- Headquarters: 113, Cottenham Road, London, United Kingdom
- Products: Aircraft propellers

The Falcon Airscrew Company was a British manufacturer of wooden aircraft propellers, formed during the first World War. In 1923 they claimed 90% of the United Kingdom's propeller production but had closed by the end of the decade.

== History ==
Formed by D. M. Davies during World War I, Falcon Airscrew gained a good reputation for its wooden propellers and survived the difficult transition to post-war production levels, concentrating on quality handbuilt wooden airscrews. Between 1922 and 1923, business expended significantly, and the company claimed to supply 90% of British aircraft demand. By 1924 Flight reported that they were probably known worldwide as the largest manufacturer of airscrews, producing a very wide range of sizes and types, including two-, three- and four-blade propellers, for almost all current engines. They were the largest suppliers of propellers to the British Air Ministry and most of the British Air Services' aircraft used Falcon airscrews. They also exported to most European countries. Production was running at 100-150 units per week. Falcon Airscrews also introduced a new way of attaching metal sheet to the propeller leading edges to protect them from damage. Despite this dominance in the early 1920s, by the end of the decade Falcon Airscrews had ceased trading.

== See also ==
- List of aircraft propeller manufacturers
