= Props Inc =

American aircraft propeller manufacturer

- Industry: Aerospace
- Founded: 1985
- Founder: Jeff Bertuleit
- Headquarters: Newport, Oregon, United States
- Products: Aircraft propellers
- Website: propsinc.net

Props Inc, founded in 1985 by Jeff Bertuleit, is an American manufacturer of wooden propellers for homebuilt and ultralight aircraft. The company headquarters is located in Newport, Oregon.

The company has produced over 3000 propellers for a wide range of engines, including Lycoming, Continental, Rotax, Rotec, Hirth, Jabiru and Volkswagen air-cooled engines.

== See also ==
- List of aircraft propeller manufacturers
