= Sensenich Propeller =

American propeller manufacturer

- Industry: Aerospace
- Founded: 1932
- Headquarters: Lancaster, Pennsylvania and Plant City, Florida, United States
- Products: Aircraft propellers
- Divisions: Sensenich Propeller Manufacturing Company; Sensenich Wood Propeller Company; Sensenich Propeller Service
- Website: www.sensenich.com

Sensenich Propeller, founded in 1932, is an American manufacturer of wood, metal and composite propellers for certified, homebuilt and ultralight aircraft, and unmanned aerial vehicles, as well as airboats. The company headquarters is located in Lititz, Pennsylvania.

The company was initially established in 1932 as Sensenich Brothers to make aircraft propellers. The company is particularly known for its wooden aircraft propellers, but also has produced fixed-pitch metal props since 1948, and in recent years expanded to adjustable-pitch carbon-fiber composite propellers. Throughout the mid-20th century, Sensenich wood props were available on nearly all 1-seat and 2-seat U.S.-made aircraft, many of which still operate today. Sensenich expanded into airboat propellers in 1949, establishing a second factory for that market at Plant City, Florida under the name Sensenich Wood Propeller Company. (Wood prop manufacturing is now handled in their Florida facility.)

== See also ==
- List of aircraft propeller manufacturers
