= Ground-adjustable propeller =

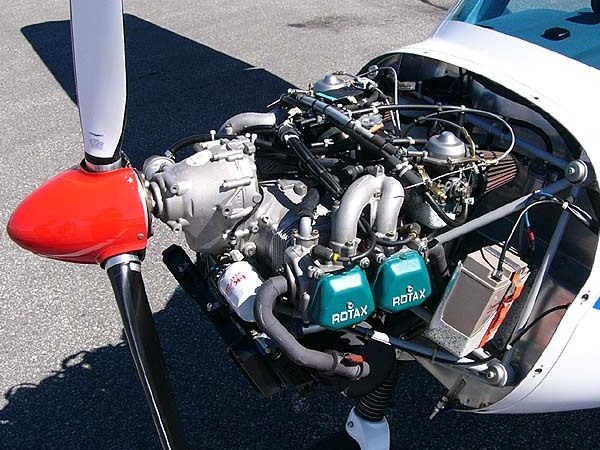
A ground adjustable propeller on a Rotax 912S engine, mounted in a 3Xtrim 3X55 Trener.

A ground-adjustable propeller is a simple type of aircraft variable-pitch propeller where the blade angle can be adjusted between pre-set limits of fine and coarse pitch. As its name implies, a ground-adjustable propeller may be adjusted only when the aircraft is on the ground and when the engine is not running.

Ground-adjustable propellers, which are mostly used on light and very light aircraft, are much cheaper and lighter than more sophisticated and versatile in-flight-adjustable propellers. A ground-adjustable propeller allows pitch changes to be made, although not in flight, to optimise the aircraft for current payload and flying conditions.

== Adjustment ==
To adjust the propeller, the blades are loosened in the hub, a new angle set and then the hub tightened. The process is one of compromise, and of trial & error. After a flight, if, say, climb seemed too sluggish, the pitch angle may have been set too coarse and would need to be made finer. Alternatively, if the aircraft reached take-off speed quickly but struggled to reach a comfortable cruise speed, the pitch would need to be coarsened. The person making the adjustments would be advised to do so in small increments until a satisfactory outcome were reached.

== Manufacturers ==
- Arplast EcoProp
- Ivoprop
- Warp Drive Inc
- Woodcomp

== See also ==
- List of aircraft propeller manufacturers
