= W. D. Oddy & Company =

British aircraft propeller manufacturer

W. D. Oddy & Company Ltd
- Industry: Aerospace
- Founded: c. 1917 as limited liability company, October 1919
- Founder: William Davey Oddy
- Headquarters: Propeller Works, Leeds, United Kingdom
- Products: Aircraft propellers

W. D. Oddy & Company Ltd was a British manufacturer of wooden aircraft propellers, formed in 1919. The company was the main supplier of propellers to Blackburn Aircraft in the first half of the 1920s.

== History ==
Oddy worked with the early aircraft pioneer Robert Blackburn, founder of the Blackburn Aeroplane and Motor Company. W. D. Oddy & Company were advertising their airscrews at least as early as 1917. In 1919 Oddy patented a propeller copying and profiling machine. The limited liability company was formed in October 1919, set up with £25,000 of share capital and Blackburn as co-director. In just over a year from its establishment, Oddy had been granted other patents concerning the design, making and finishing of propellers.

Until the mid-1920s, W. D. Oddy & Co. was the main supplier of airscrews to Blackburn Aircraft. They also provided propellers for other aircraft, including 17 ft 6 in (5.33 m) diameter ones for the R38 class airship. These, built entirely from Honduras mahogany and fitted with a lightning conductor strip from tips to boss, were amongst the largest of their day. Another Oddy propeller took the Alliance-Napier Seabird, powered by a Napier Lion engine, from London to Madrid in less than 8 hours.

In 1920 Oddy were developing a propeller with variable and reversible pitch.

As well as making airscrews for propelling aircraft, W. D. Oddy also built them for other purposes. They saw a future for motor boats driven by aerial propellers and provided a four bladed airscrew for A. E. Guinness' Napier Lion powered boat Oma. Other, smaller Oddy airscrews drove dynamos to provide electrical power.

The company disappears from the records after about 1925; it may have been absorbed into Blackburns later.

== See also ==
- List of aircraft propeller manufacturers
