= Performance Propellers =

American aircraft propeller manufacturer

- Industry: Aerospace
- Headquarters: Donie, Texas, United States
- Products: Aircraft propellers
- Website: performancepropellersusa.com

Performance Propellers, officially Performance Propellers USA, LLC, is an American manufacturer of wooden propellers for homebuilt and ultralight aircraft. The company headquarters is located in Donie, Texas and was formerly in Patagonia, Arizona.

The company makes wooden two and three-bladed propellers from maple laminates, with rain-proof leading edges and fiberglass tips, for engines up to 300 hp (224 kW).

== See also ==
- List of aircraft propeller manufacturers
