= Barber Snark =

New Zealand homebuilt aircraft

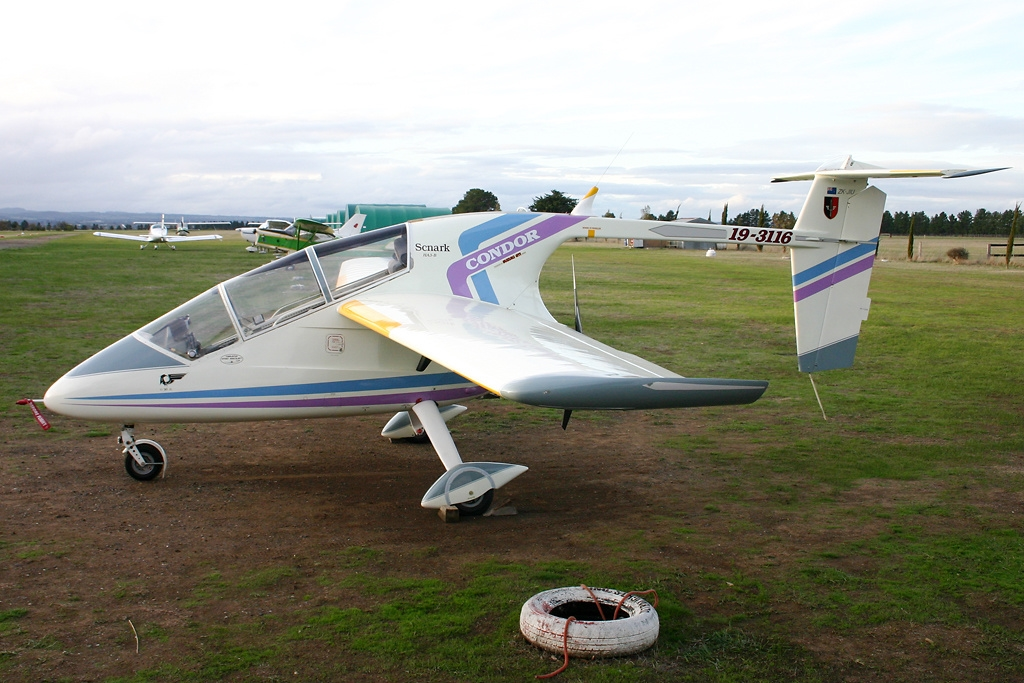

General information
- Type: Light aircraft
- National origin: New Zealand
- Manufacturer: homebuilt
- Designer: Bill Barber
- Status: Production discontinued
- Number built: about 6

History
- First flight: 1987

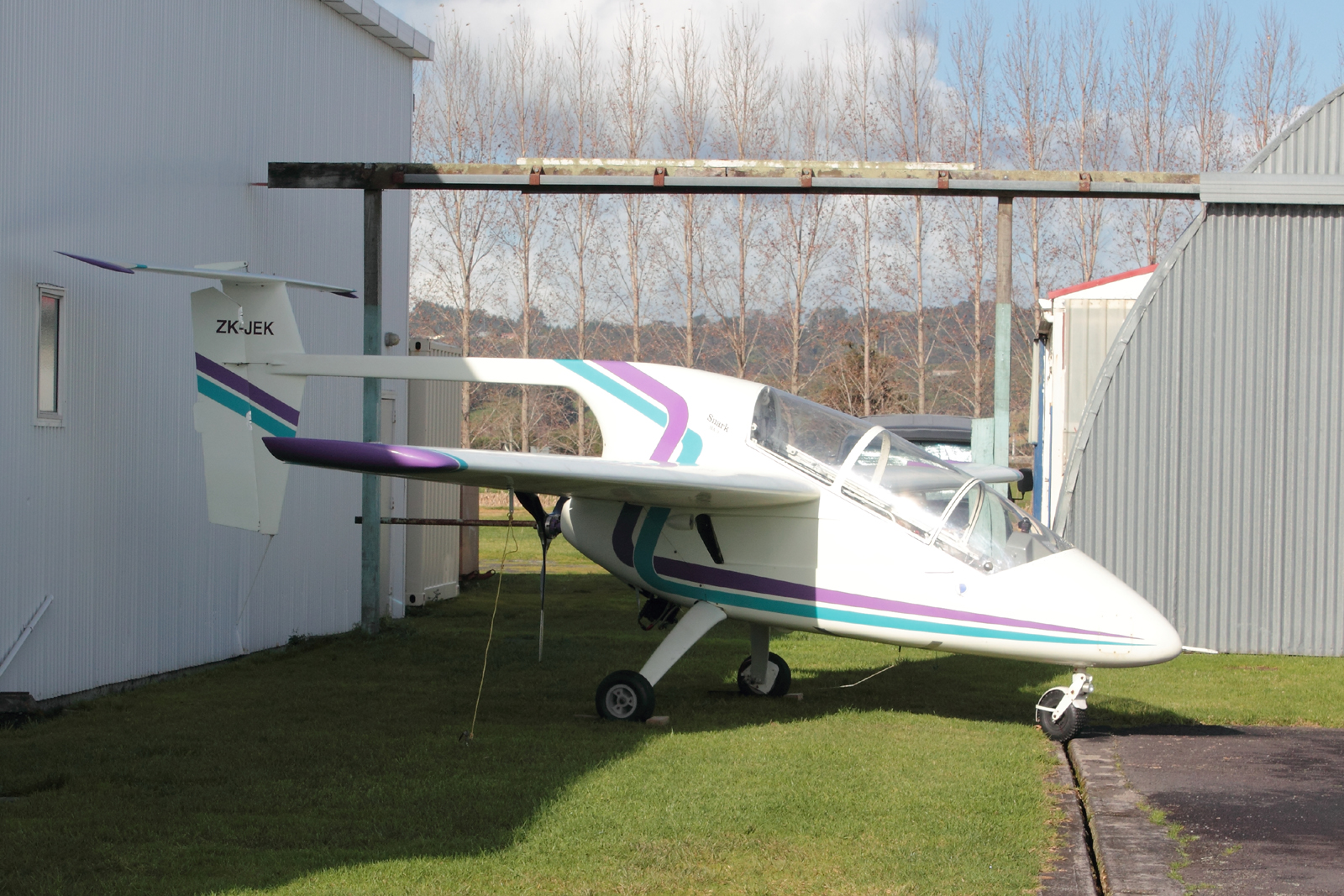
HA3 with tandem cockpit and high tail boom

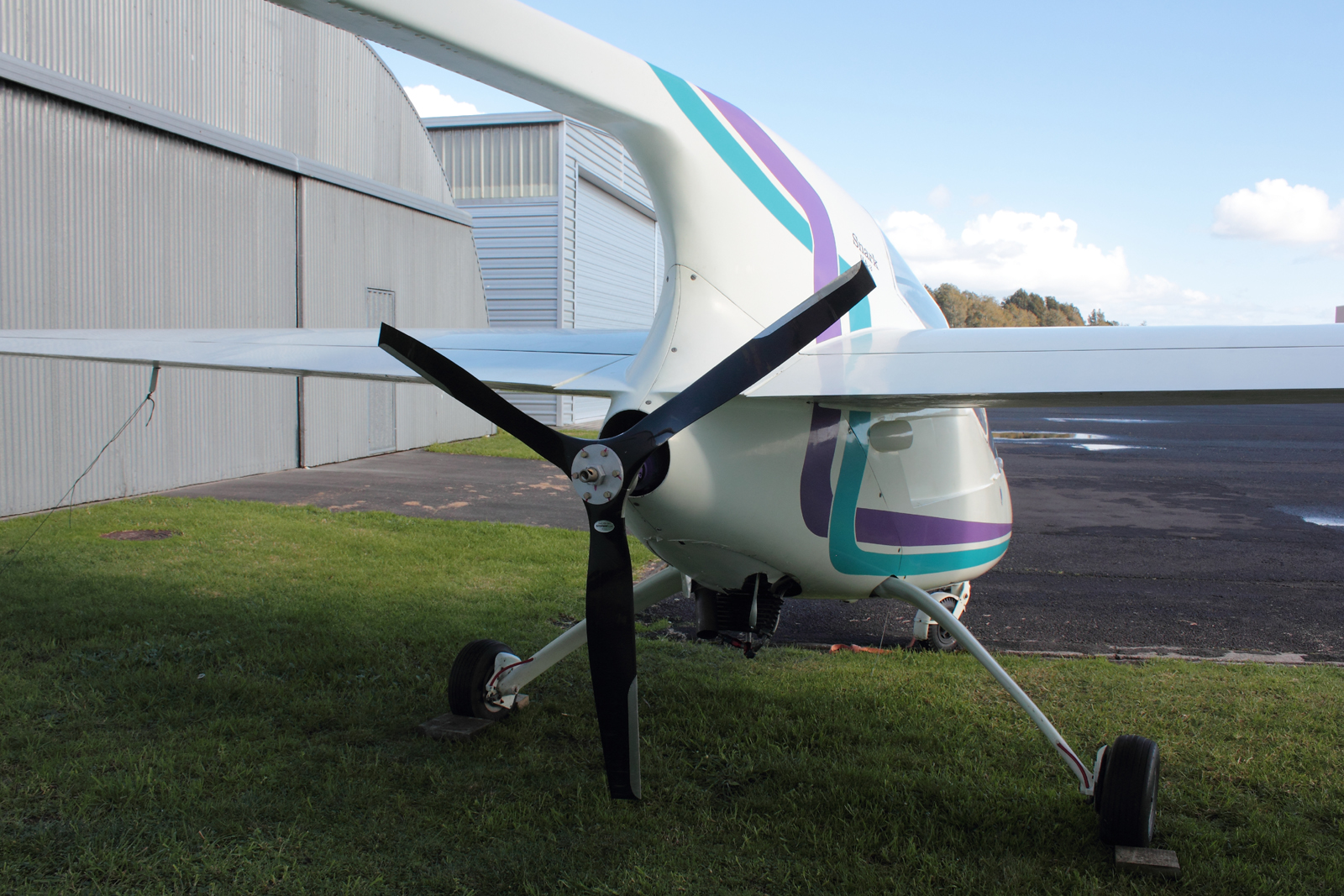
Rear view of pusher propeller

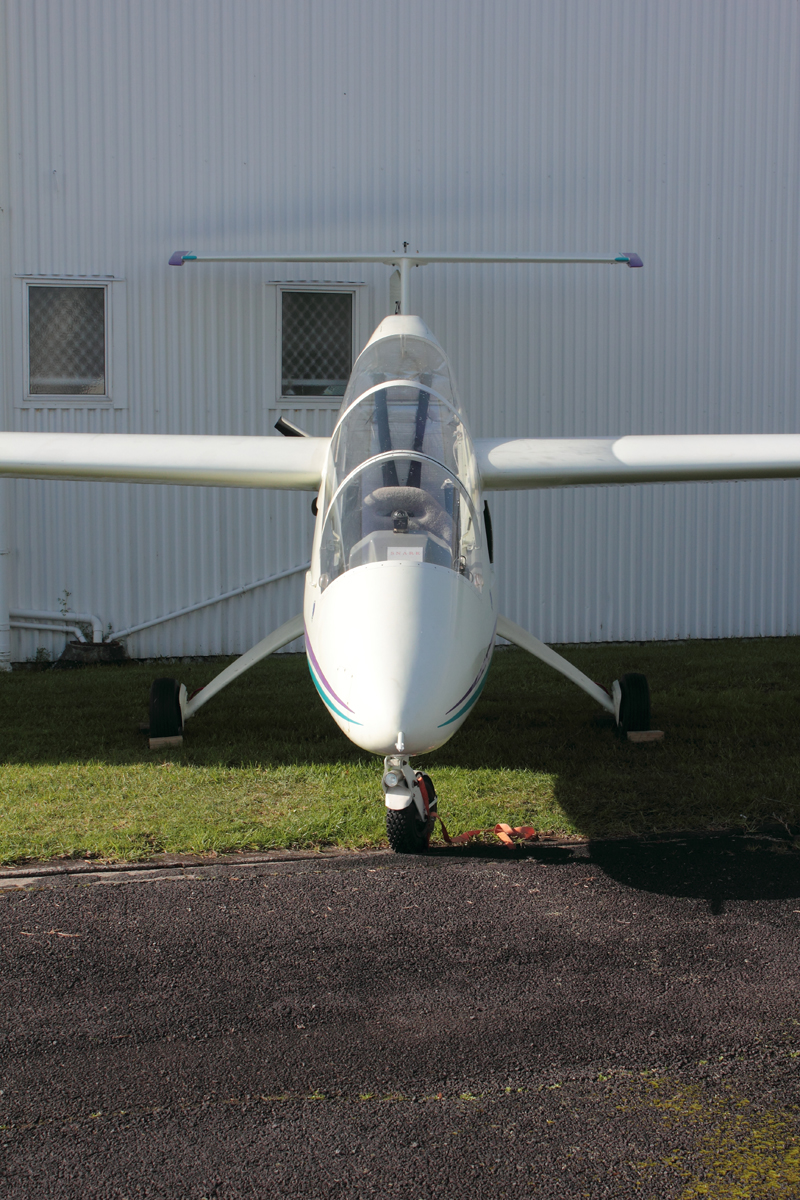
Mid-wing layout with small frontal area

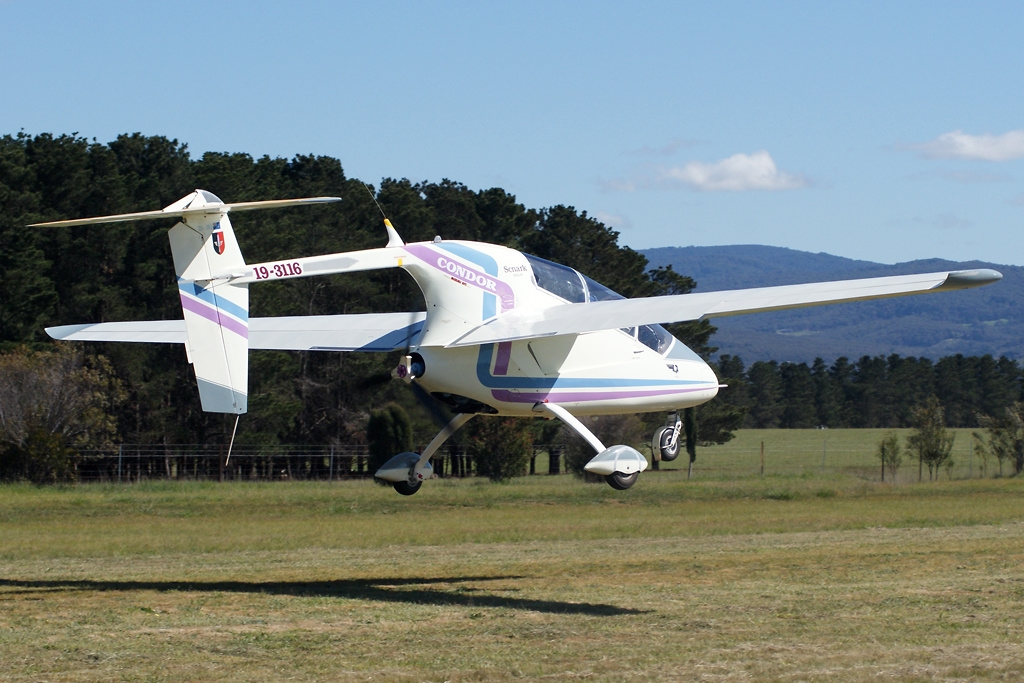
Snark flying in Australia

The Barber Snark is a series of six innovative microlight aircraft, designed and built in New Zealand by Bill Barber. The sequential designs are named: HA1, HA2, HA3, HA3-B, HA3-C, and HA3-D.

Barber's first attempt at designing a microlight aircraft was the Snark HA-1 single-seat monoplane. Powered by a Rotax 503 two-stroke, it used a long shaft to drive a pusher propeller mounted behind the Y-shaped tail (much like the Lear Fan 2100). It was registered as ZK-FOU and trials began in 1987. Barber was unhappy with its characteristics, and was never flown (except for a few short hops), "due to an attack of 'extreme cowardice' on the part of the builder". The main concern was that the lower fin of the Y-shaped empennage would scrape the runway on take-off and landing. Although Barber stated that the HA1 "may be re-visited sometime", that project was shelved, and Barber progressed to a radically different series of designs, namely HA2 onwards.

The prototype Snark HA-2, which first flew in 1991, set the pattern for all the subsequent HA3 designs. The HA2 (and all HA3 models) have a streamlined tandem layout, tricycle landing gear, small frontal area, shoulder wing, a pusher propeller, and an empennage supported by a high level tail boom. The pilot sits at the front, the passenger sitting behind on a raised seat at the aircraft's centre of gravity. The wing area of 134.5 sq. ft could allow engine-off soaring; a reduced wing area would increase the cruising speed

These HA2/HA3 models have impressive performance, cruising at over 100 knots despite having an engine output of only 80 bhp. Six HA2 aircraft were built. These have varying specifications, such as different engines, construction materials, main undercarriage and control surfaces.

== Design and development ==
(Source materials for this section are derived from Tim Cripp's article in Today's Pilot magazine of September 2006)

The Snark is a tricycle aircraft of composite carbon-kevlar construction. Its glider-like cockpit accommodates a pilot and passenger in tandem, the passenger sitting behind and higher than the pilot. The centrally mounted shoulder-wing lies behind the pilot, who has unrestricted visibility. The 80 hp (60 kW) engine is mounted on the main bulkhead behind the cockpit, driving a pusher propeller. Wing control surfaces on the third Snark are flaperons, while the fourth and later aircraft have conventional ailerons and flaps. Above the propeller, aft of the cockpit, is a slender carbon-fibre boom supporting a T-tail empennage. The high-level tailplane is mounted above the propeller slipstream. There is a springy nylon skid beneath the fin to protect the propeller from ground strikes.

Former RNZAF Squadron Leader and aviation journalist Tim Cripps wrote an extensive article in Today's Pilot, highly praising the Snark, and describing its history, ingenious design, and flying ability. The aircraft under test, ZK-JPS, was fitted with Rotax 912S flat-four engine producing 100hp.

=== Pivoting main gear ===
The main undercarriage legs are a Grove alloy beam. The legs are pivoted fore-and-aft by a hydraulic pump hand-operated within the cockpit. On the ground, the wheels are positioned aft of the empty CG. Once aboard, the pilot pumps the wheels forward to allow a correct CG for take-off and landing. When back on the ground and parked, the hydraulic pressure is released, so the wheels move backwards again before the pilot dismounts. This design means that when the cockpit is vacated, there is no inherent tendency for the aircraft to tip backwards, thereby avoiding the risk (common in tandem microlights) of the propeller being damaged or the aircraft left vulnerable to being blown over.

=== Wings ===
The removable wings have a "near-laminar" Riblett GA 37 A 315 section, chosen as it has a very low pitching moment. The point of maximum thickness is at 37% of the chord, which is further aft than other typical microlights. The wings taper from root to tip, with both chord and thickness reducing symmetrically.

=== Propeller ===
On ZK-JPS, its Arplast composite three-blade, variable-pitch pusher propeller is not mounted directly onto the engine gearbox, but has an 18" (46cm) extension tube to allow clean airflow right to the propeller hub. Bill Barber designed a flexible clutch to successfully overcome torsional vibrations at low engine speeds.

== Reception ==
The Snark received positive reviews in the UK and NZ press. David Laing, a former WWII pilot who assembled the fourth Snark, declared it to be "one of the nicest planes I've ever flown". Tim Cripps added in Today's Pilot, "this is the most enjoyable of the many aircraft I have flown - and that includes the Hunter".

== Specifications (Barber Snark) ==
Data from Treweek

General characteristics

- Crew: one
- Capacity: one passenger
- Length: 6.24 m (20 ft 6 in)
- Wingspan: 9.3 m (30 ft 6 in)
- Height: 2.43 m (8 ft 0 in)
- Empty weight: 331 kg (730 lb)
- Max takeoff weight: 520 kg (1,146 lb)
- Fuel capacity: 55 litres (15 US gal) usable
- Powerplant: 1 × Suzuki G13 four stroke, 60 kW (80 hp)

Performance

- Cruise speed: 205 km/h (127 mph, 111 kn)
- Stall speed: 61 km/h (38 mph, 33 kn) with flaps
- Never exceed speed: 225 km/h (140 mph, 121 kn)
- Range: 1,040 km (650 mi, 560 nmi)
- Service ceiling: 3,658 m (12,001 ft)
- Rate of climb: 7.12 m/s (1,402 ft/min)
