= MW Propellers =

American aircraft propeller manufacturer

- Industry: Aerospace
- Fate: Out of business
- Headquarters: Tucson, Arizona, United States
- Products: Aircraft propellers

MW Propellers was an American manufacturer of wooden propellers for homebuilt and ultralight aircraft. Its headquarters was in Tucson, Arizona.

It built maple laminate propellers for engines of 65 to 260 hp (48 to 194 kW).

== See also ==
- List of aircraft propeller manufacturers
