= Sport Prop =

Sport Prop s.r.o.
- Industry: Aerospace
- Headquarters: Prague, Czech Republic
- Products: Aircraft propellers

Sport Prop s.r.o. is a Czech manufacturer of composite propellers for homebuilt and ultralight aircraft. The company headquarters is located in Prague.

== See also ==
- List of aircraft propeller manufacturers
