= Lang Propellers =

British aircraft propeller manufacturer, 1913–1936

Lang Propeller Co. Ltd
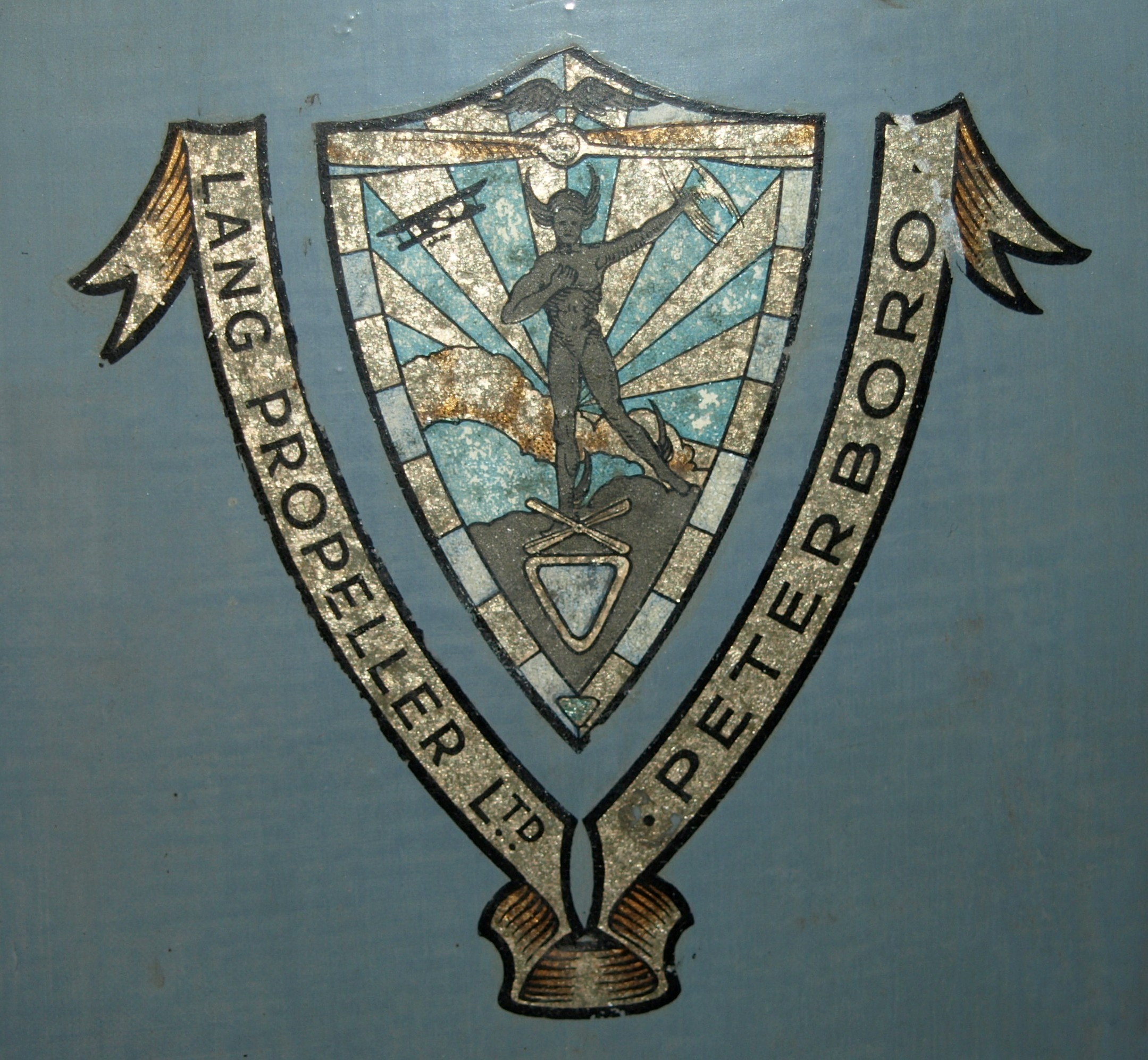
- Industry: Aviation, engineering, airscrew production
- Predecessor: Lang, Garnett & Co.
- Founded: 1913
- Defunct: 1936
- Fate: Ceased aircraft equipment and laminate manufacture
- Successor: The Airscrew Co. Ltd
- Headquarters: Weybridge, Surrey, and Peterborough England
- Key people: A.A.D. Lang
- Products: Propellers, fans, laminate products
- Brands: Weyroc, Weydec, Hardec

Lang Propellers was a British company that manufactured aircraft propellers. The company operated independently from 1913 to 1936.

== History ==
In 1909 Arthur Alexander Dashwood Lang became interested in aircraft propeller design and made some propellers in his own name. Lang developed and patented processes covering the tips of propeller blades with copper or fabric. These were used for example on Royal Aircraft Factory B.E.2C aircraft. In 1910 he went to work for the British & Colonial Aeroplane Company (later the Bristol Aircraft Co.) as manager of the propeller shop. He left in 1912 and set up in partnership with David Garnett at the Riverside Works Weybridge, Surrey.The company was called Lang, Garnett & Co. This enterprise lasted a matter of months before Garnett left the firm. Lang established the Lang Propeller company in 1913 and continued to use the "Riverside Works." These premises were later used by The Airscrew Company to manufacture propellers and associated components. At its peak the company supplied wooden propellers to nearly every aeroplane company in England.

In April 1936 the Aeronautical Corporation of Great Britain, Ltd was incorporated. The new company was formed to acquire the assets of companies involved in the UK production of the Aeronca aircraft, and to acquire from Lang Propellers Ltd., the whole of its assets. These comprised rights under British Patents relating to machines for shaping airscrew blades applied for by Lang. The new company bought a factory at Walton near Peterborough that had been built during the first world war for Frederick Sage & Company for aircraft production.

=== Lang USA ===
The Lang Propeller Company of America Inc. was established as a Manhattan corporation with a capital of $45,000, with Lang, L. L. Montant and E. N. Bush as directors in August 1917. Dashwood Lang had just sold his UK company to the Sopwith Aircraft company and this was a new enterprise. The US Navy contracted Lang to supply them with propellers and paid for the construction of a factory at Whitestone on Long Island. By late 1917 the company name was changed to Lang Products Co. Prior to the factory being completed Lang subcontracted the manufacture of his designs to local US and Canadian producers.

== Arthur Alexander Dashwood Lang ==
Lang formed another company A. D. Lang Ltd. In 1921 it was described as being general manufacturers, buying and selling agents, printers, lithographers, manufacturers of chemicals with offices at 4, Vigo Street, London W1. In addition to his work in developing propellers and associated equipment, Lang found time in 1923 to patent a wheel for vehicles. In 1936 Lang joined the Board of Hordern-Richmond, another British company that was closely involved in the development and production of airscrews and propellers.

== See also ==
- List of aircraft propeller manufacturers
