= The Airscrew Company =

British manufacturing company, 1923–1990s

- Industry: Aviation, engineering
- Predecessor: Lang Propeller Co.
- Founded: 1923
- Defunct: 1990s
- Fate: Ceased aircraft equipment and laminate manufacture
- Successor: AMETEK UK Ltd, Egger UK Ltd
- Headquarters: Addlestone & Weybridge, Surrey, England
- Key people: J.D.Titler, Dr.H.C.Watts
- Products: Propellers, fans, laminate products
- Brands: Weyroc, Weydec, Hardec

The Airscrew Company Ltd (incorporating the Jicwood company) was a British manufacturing company based in Surrey manufacturing propellers.

== History ==
The Airscrew Company was established in Weybridge, Surrey, England in 1923 when John Dodds Titler bought the assets of Lang, Garnett and Company, otherwise known as the Lang Propeller Company of Riverside Works, Weybridge. Lang Propellers was based at Hamm Moor Lane and at its peak supplied wooden propellers to nearly every aeroplane company in England. Alcock and Brown flew the Atlantic in a Vickers Vimy fitted with Lang propellers; a letter held at Chertsey Museum confirms this and one of these four-bladed propellers survives at Brooklands Museum. The Lang company was absorbed into another aeronautical enterprise and vacated its works in Surrey. The company manufactured 2-blade wooden propellers for the early Spitfires and Hurricanes.

Airscrew became a limited company in 1931, and by 1938 had formed Jicwood Ltd as a joint venture between Itself and Halila, Ltd., of Bush House, London. The nominal capital of £36,000 was taken up between the Airscrew Co. and Halila. The board consisted of Mr. J. D. Titler (chairman), Dr. Henry Charles Watts (co-designer of the Leitner Watts propeller), Mr. R. Bradfield and Mr. F. T. Swann. Mr. Swann, who was a director of Halila, Ltd., joined the board of The Airscrew Co.(Flight of 9 December 1937)

The organisation employed around 200 staff at a site in Hamm Moor Lane, Addlestone. By the beginning of World War II, the company was also making wooden-bladed ventilation fans and wind tunnels. Jicwood Ltd., the subsidiary company, manufactured fully compressed wood for various purposes. An extremely light sandwich material which consists of expanded rubber between either plywood or a light alloy were also manufactured. Samples of this product 24 ins. sq., weighing 52 ozs., were able to withstand a distributive load of 1 ½ tons when supported at two edges. The properties of this material were those required in aircraft flooring, bomb doors, superstructures and bulkheads for motor torpedo boats.

Wartime production requirements raised staff numbers to nearly 2,000 by 1945, and the company had its own Home Guard platoon, fire brigade and St John's Ambulance sections.

== Post war work ==
Sheppard Robson the architectural firm founded by Richard Sheppard designed The Jicwood Bungalow in 1944 in response to the Need for temporary housing in the post war period and used materials such as stressed timber used in aircraft manufacture.

The company diversified further and developed a wide range of products, notably aircraft and Bus panels and bulkheads, transit containers, ventilating equipment and wind tunnels and most importantly laminate wood products, manufactured as 'Weyroc', and also glass fibre products. The company changed its name to The Airscrew Company and Jicwood Ltd in 1950.

The company was bought by Bryant & May in 1957, shortly after J D Titler's death in April 1957. Under the terms of the agreement Bryant and May invested £500,000 in the company. Eoin Mekie, chairman of British Aviation Services, Frank Lynam became Managing Director (before joining the Airscrew Co., Lynam was with the firm of Metal Propellers Ltd, of Croydon, Surrey and the Airscrew section of the RAE). Airscrew was approached by Saunders-Roe in October 1958 for a fan design for the SR-N1hovercraft.

Under Bryant & May ownership two associated companies were created; Airscrew-Weyroc Canada (a chipboard making facility) & Airscrew Fans Ltd. The company then passed into Swedish control when Bryant & May merged into Swedish Match.In 1961 the company changed its name to Airscrew -Weyroc Ltd (Weyroc being the trade title of their wood chipboard product). W.J.S. King-Smith became the managing director of the Fan Division until he retired (c.1973).

In 1966 Airscrew-Weyroc Ltd, received an order for ten fans for the Anglo-French Concorde. These were required for cooling the electronic equipment on prototype aircraft and for ground testing work to meet the rigid requirements of the cooling specification-, they were of a compact, light-weight, low-noise, high-efficiency type.

The company was bought by the Howden Group in c.1971, developing a range of fans for cooling and extraction purposes. In 1986, the Weybridge site was sold, demolished and redeveloped and Airscrew moved to 111 Windmill Road, Sunbury on Thames.

In December 1990 Airscrew Howden acquired Frazer-Nash Defence Systems for an undisclosed sum, following Frazer-Nash's entry into receivership. The Frazer-Nash Defence Systems division was sold in 1996 to ML Aviation Marcel Lobelle .

Around this time Weyroc products were manufactured in Hexham, Northumberland, with weyroc production having commenced on the site in 1964 and Weydec following shortly thereafter, and continue to be so since 1995 when Egger Uk Ltd. acquired Weyroc Ltd.

The Airscrew Company became a principal subsidiary of the Airtechnology Group of the UK and has since been absorbed into Ametek Inc's Aerospace & Defence division based at the Windmill Road site producing AC and DC brushless, mixed flow, tubeaxial and vaneaxial fans, high-pressure blowers, AC and DC brushless motors and drivecsystems, build-to-print and custom subassemblies, electronic and fault sensing devices, electric heaters, switches and sensors.

Airscrew products have been used in various locomotives such as the Gardermoen High Speed Train and the Eurostar train.

== See also ==
- Aerospace industry in the United Kingdom
- List of aircraft propeller manufacturers
