= Competition Aircraft =

American aircraft propeller manufacturer

- Industry: Aerospace
- Founder: Jack Venaleck
- Headquarters: Grass Valley, California, United States
- Key people: President: Bob Davis
- Products: Aircraft propellers
- Website: www.competitionaircraft.com

Competition Aircraft Inc, founded in 1980 by Jack Venaleck, is an American manufacturer of composite propellers for ultralight aircraft. The company headquarters is located in Grass Valley, California.

Competition Aircraft started as a subsidiary of Associated Enterprises of Painesville, Ohio. The company started producing aircraft propellers in 1983 under the Ultra-Prop brand. The company produces propellers with up to six blades.

== See also ==
- List of aircraft propeller manufacturers
