= Arplast Helice =

Former French manufacturer of aircraft

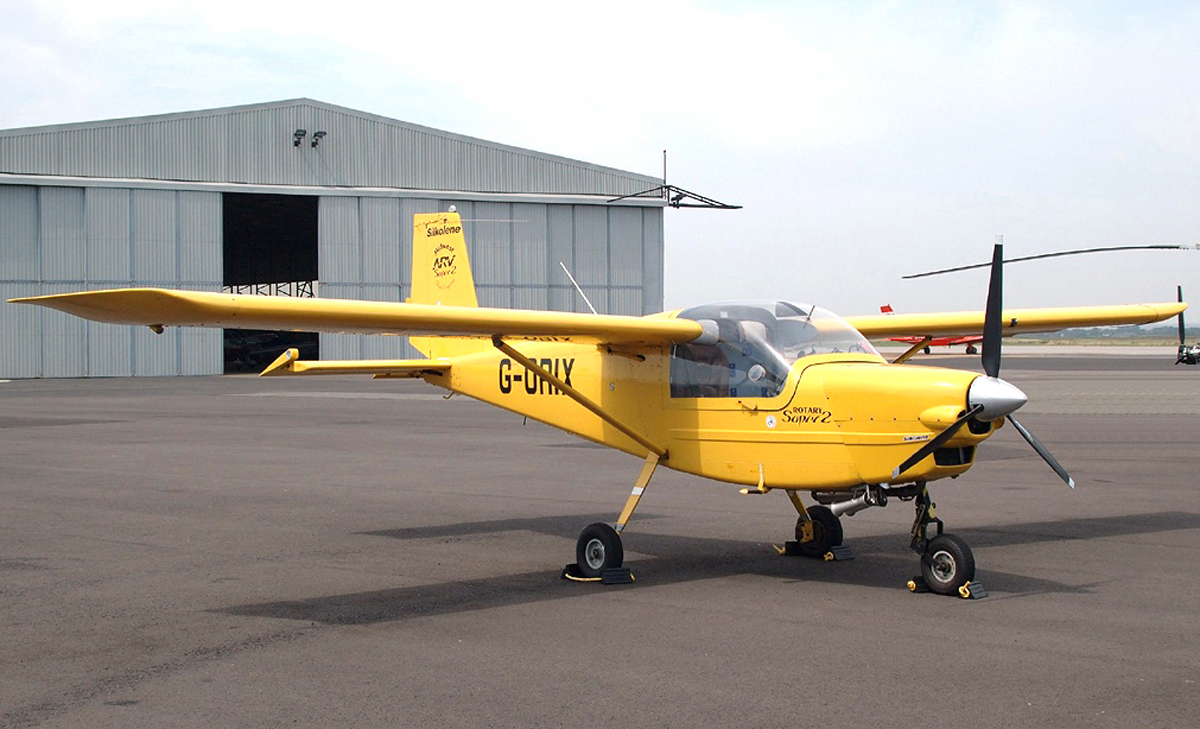
Ground-adjustable Arplast Ecoprop on ARV Super2

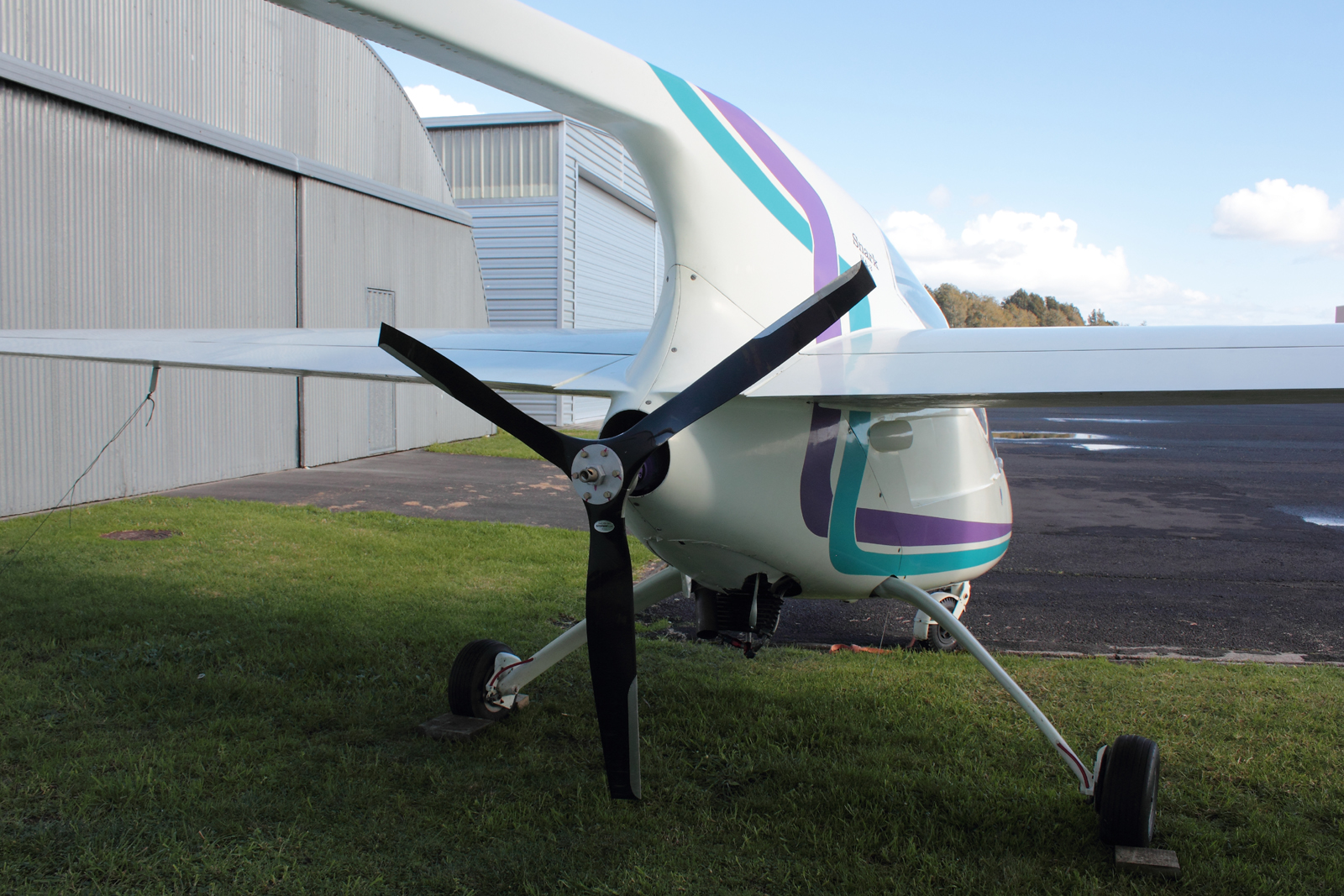
Arplast Ecoprop on Barber Snark

Arplast Helice is a former French manufacturer of propellers for light aircraft and microlights. The company was based at Gargas, France. The company appears to have been wound up on 29 April 2015.

The firm's main product was the composite 3-bladed "Ecoprop", which can be fixed, ground-adjustable, in-flight adjustable, or automatically folding. The Ecoprop modular propellers are lightweight, have a very slim profile and are very efficient. Also, the firm once produced its own microlight aircraft, the Arplast Micro'B.

Arplast propellers have been fitted, (inter alia), to the following aircraft:

- ARV Super2
- Barber Snark

== See also ==
Le Dauphiné article - http://www.ledauphine.com/economie-et-finance/2013/12/03/le-concepteur-d-helices-en-carbone-arplast-se-diversifie
