= Precision Propellers =

American aircraft propeller manufacturer

- Industry: Aerospace
- Founded: 1979
- Founder: Jeff Johnson
- Fate: Out of business, circa 2007
- Headquarters: Gold Canyon, Arizona, United States
- Products: Aircraft propellers

Precision Propellers LLC, founded in 1979 by Jeff Johnson, was an American manufacturer of wooden propellers for homebuilt and ultralight aircraft. Once established at Vernal, Utah, the company headquarters was last located in Gold Canyon, Arizona.

The company produced propellers with two to six blades, up to 72 in (183 cm) in diameter for engines up to 150 hp (112 kW).

== See also ==
- List of aircraft propeller manufacturers
