= Aymar-DeMuth Propellers =

Defunct American propeller manufacturer

- Industry: Aerospace
- Headquarters: Ellicott City, Maryland, United States
- Products: Aircraft propellers

Aymar-DeMuth Propellers was an American manufacturer of wood laminate and composite propellers for homebuilt aircraft. The company headquarters was located in Ellicott City, Maryland.

The company produced a line of two-bladed maple laminate propellers as well as wood-glass composite designs for aircraft with two-stroke or four stroke engines up to 300 hp (224 kW), such as the Van's Aircraft RV-7, Thorpe T-18 and Glasair.

The company discontinued operations in 2012 after the death of its founder, Mike DeMuth.

== See also ==
- List of aircraft propeller manufacturers
