= Whirl Wind Propellers =

American aircraft propeller manufacturer

- Industry: Aerospace
- Headquarters: Piqua Ohio, United States
- Products: Aircraft propellers
- Website: www.whirlwindpropellers.com

Whirl Wind Propellers Corporation, is an American manufacturer of composite propellers for homebuilt and light-sport aircraft. The company headquarters is located in Piqua Ohio.

The company makes composite ground adjustable aircraft propellers as well as replacement blades for the Nanchang CJ-6's V530 propeller and also airboat propellers.

== See also ==
- List of aircraft propeller manufacturers
