= Felix Propellers =

Defunct American propeller manufacturer

- Industry: Aerospace
- Fate: Out of business
- Headquarters: Camp Douglas, Wisconsin, United States
- Products: Aircraft propellers

Felix Propellers Inc, was an American manufacturer of wooden propellers for homebuilt and ultralight aircraft as well as antiques. The company headquarters was located in Camp Douglas, Wisconsin.

The company produced fixed-pitch wooden propellers with two or four blades, with diameters from 50 to 90 in (127 to 229 cm) and for aircraft engines up to 350 hp (261 kW).

== See also ==
- List of aircraft propeller manufacturers
