= Bernie Warnke Propellers =

American aircraft propeller manufacturer

- Industry: Aerospace
- Headquarters: Tucson, Arizona, United States
- Products: Aircraft propellers
- Owner: Margie Warnke

Bernie Warnke Propellers, founded by Bernie Warnke, is an American manufacturer of wooden propellers for homebuilt and aerobatic aircraft. The company headquarters is located in Tucson, Arizona.

Warnke makes propellers for engines up to 260 hp (194 kW) from maple laminates.

== See also ==
- List of aircraft propeller manufacturers
