= Prince Aircraft =

American aircraft manufacturer

- Industry: Aerospace
- Founded: 1979
- Founder: Lonnie Prince
- Headquarters: Whitehouse, Ohio, United States
- Products: Aircraft propellers
- Website: princeaircraft.com

Prince Aircraft Company, founded in 1979 by Lonnie Prince, is an American manufacturer of wood and composite propellers for homebuilt and ultralight aircraft. The company headquarters is located in Whitehouse, Ohio.

Prince founded his company as a part-time business and worked full-time as an air traffic controller until the 1981 PATCO strike after which he devoted full-time attention to the company.

The company produces a unique product, the Prince P-TIP Propeller, with clipped and curved tips. The propeller designs are available in both wooden and carbon fiber construction.

== See also ==
- List of aircraft propeller manufacturers
