= Culver Props =

Defunct American propeller manufacturer

- Industry: Aerospace
- Fate: Absorbed into Valley Engineering LLC in 2001
- Headquarters: Rolla, Missouri, United States
- Products: Aircraft propellers
- Owner: Valley Engineering LLC
- Website: www.culverprops.com

Culver Props Inc, was an American manufacturer of wooden propellers for homebuilt and ultralight aircraft. In 2001 the company ceased production and was purchased by Valley Engineering LLC. Valley Engineering turned the company into a brand of propellers, which remains in production.

Culver Props Inc had its company headquarters in Galeton, Pennsylvania. In 2001 the production equipment was moved to Valley Engineering and is now located in Rolla, Missouri.

The company makes one-piece wooden propellers carved from northern hard maple and birch.

== See also ==
- List of aircraft propeller manufacturers
