= Büttner Propeller =

German aircraft and propeller manufacturer

- Company type: Privately held company
- Industry: Aerospace
- Headquarters: Obernkirchen, Germany
- Key people: Gerald Büttner
- Products: Powered parachutes, paramotors, aircraft propellers
- Website: www.crazy-plane.de

Büttner Propeller, also known as Gerald Büttner - Obernkirchen, is a German aircraft manufacturer based in Obernkirchen and founded by Gerald Büttner. The company specializes in the design and manufacture of powered parachutes, paramotors and aircraft propellers. The aircraft are ready-to-fly designs for the European Fédération Aéronautique Internationale microlight and 120 kg (260 lb) categories.

The company has a line of paramotors (Rucksackmotoren) called the Büttner Crazy Plane and a line of powered parachutes (Gleitschirm Trikes) called the Büttner Crazy Flyer. At one time it also produced the Büttner Easy Plane.

Büttner also builds two-bladed carved wooden and two, three and four bladed plastic ultralight aircraft propellers.

== Aircraft ==
Summary of aircraft built by Büttner Propeller
Model name	First flight	Number built	Type
Büttner Crazy Plane			paramotor
Büttner Crazy Flyer			single and two seat powered parachutes
Büttner Easy Plane			single seat powered parachutes

== See also ==
- List of aircraft propeller manufacturers
