= Tennessee Propellers =

American aircraft propeller manufacturer

- Industry: Aerospace
- Founded: 1981
- Defunct: 2020
- Headquarters: Rising Fawn, Georgia, United States
- Products: Aircraft propellers
- Website: tn-prop.com

Tennessee Propellers, Inc, founded in 1981, was an American manufacturer of wooden propellers for homebuilt and ultralight aircraft. The company headquarters was located in Rising Fawn, Georgia.

By December 2020 the company website was up for sale and the company is presumed to have ceased business.

The company made two-bladed propellers from maple laminates in diameters up to 72 in (1.83 m) for engines up to 100 hp (75 kW). The company is also the distributor for parts for the discontinued Japanese Zenoah G-25 and G-50 line of aircraft engines. In the early 2000s they also produced their own powered parachute design, the Scout, but the aircraft is now out of production.

== Aircraft ==
- Tennessee Propellers Scout

== See also ==
- List of aircraft propeller manufacturers
