= Monoplane =

Fixed-wing aircraft with a single main wing plane

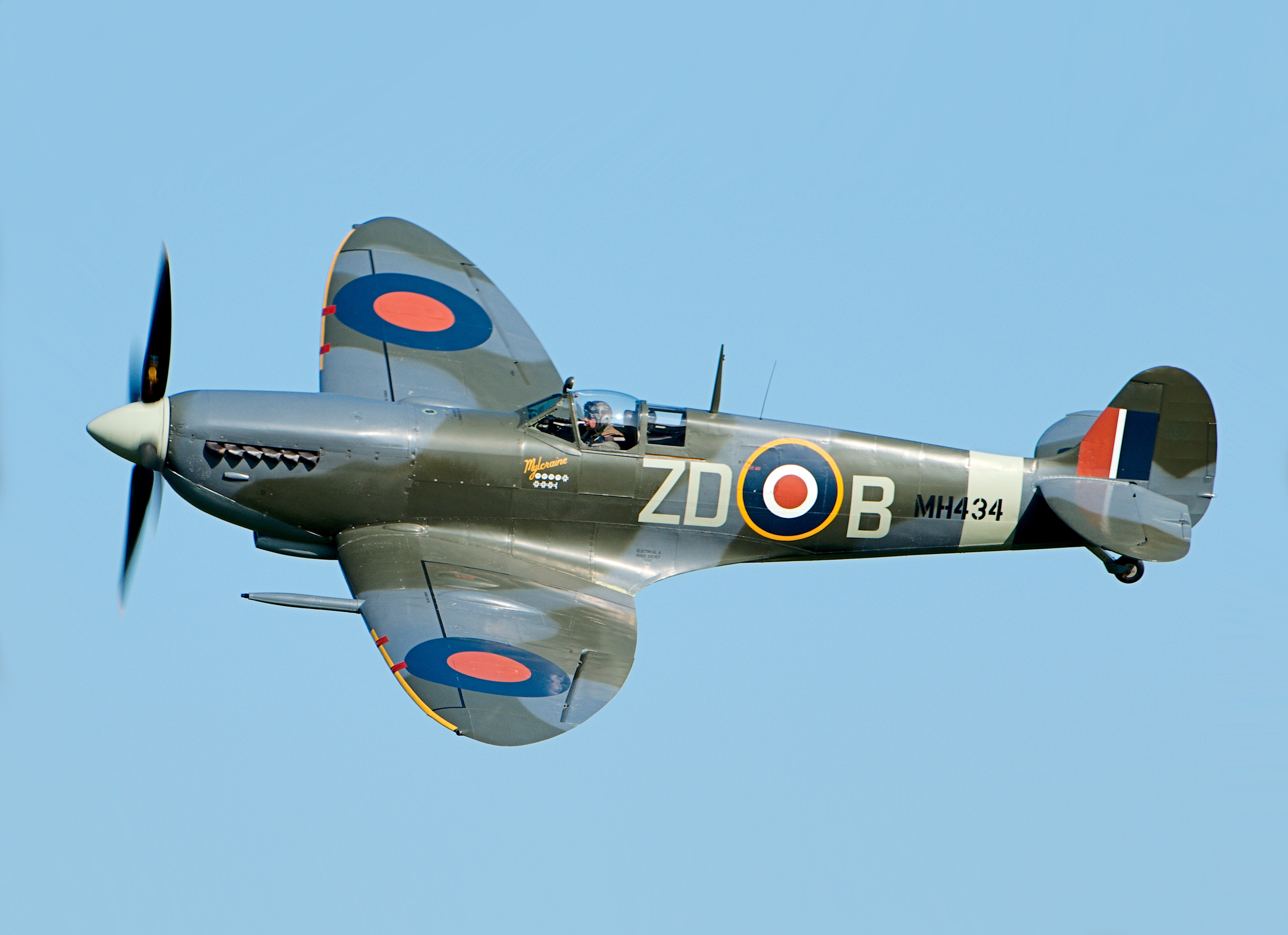
Low wing on a Supermarine Spitfire

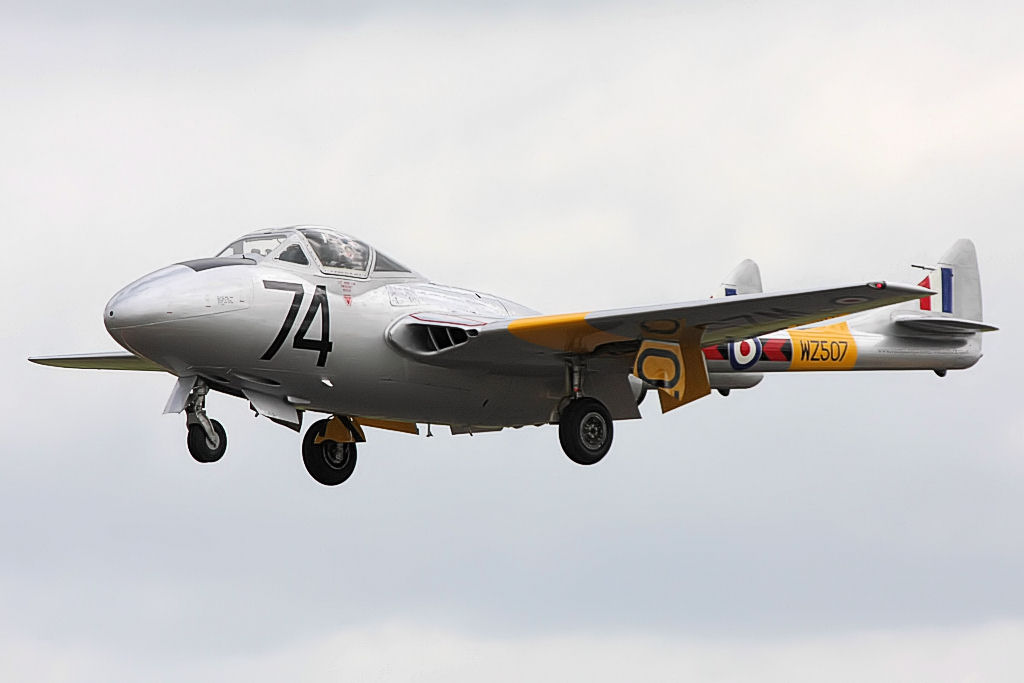
Mid wing on a de Havilland Vampire T11

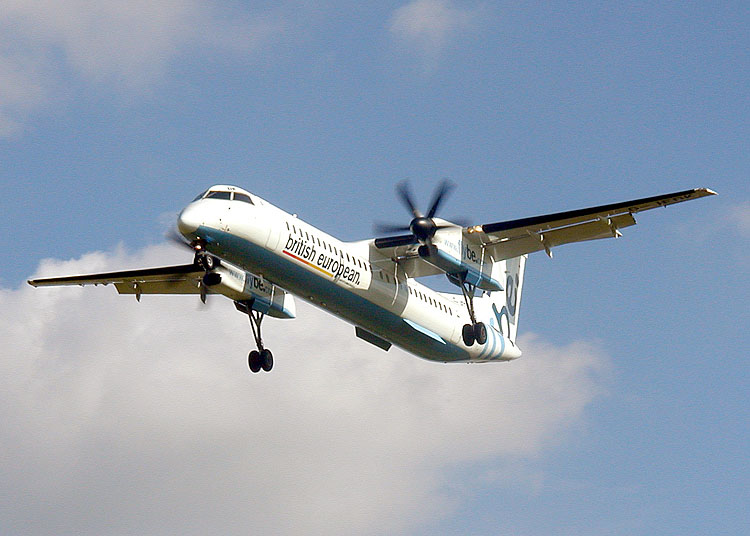
High wing on a de Havilland Canada Dash 8

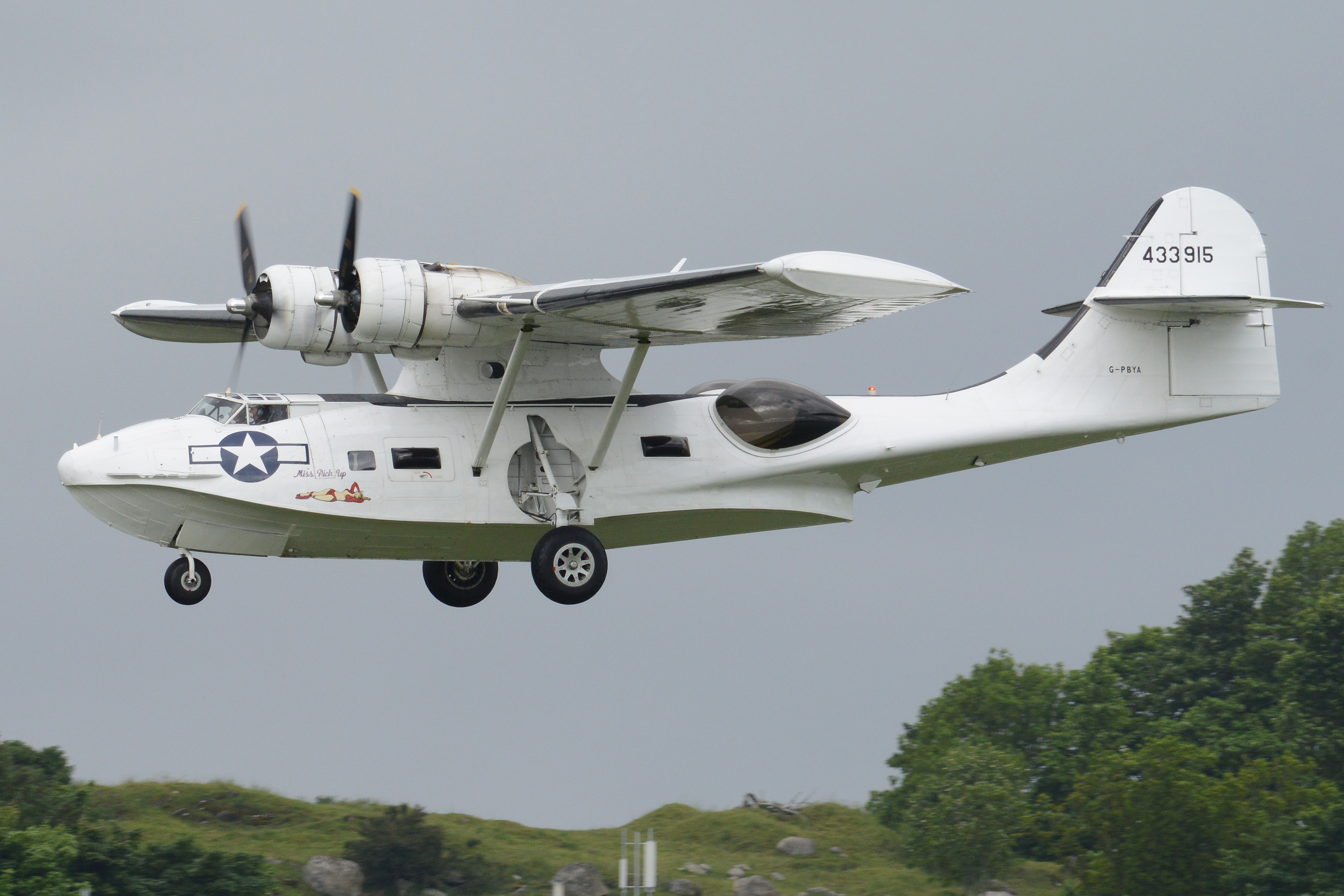
Parasol wing on a Consolidated PBY Catalina

A monoplane is a fixed-wing aircraft configuration with a single mainplane, in contrast to a biplane or other types of multiplanes, which have multiple wings.

A monoplane has inherently the highest efficiency and lowest drag of any wing configuration and is the simplest to build. However, during the early years of flight, these advantages were offset by its greater weight and lower manoeuvrability, making it relatively rare until the 1930s. Since then, the monoplane has been the most common form for a fixed-wing aircraft.

== Characteristics ==
=== Support and weight ===
The inherent efficiency of the monoplane is best achieved in the cantilever wing, which carries all structural forces internally. However, to fly at practical speeds the wing must be made thin, which requires a heavy structure to make it strong and stiff enough.

External bracing can be used to improve structural efficiency, reducing weight and cost. For a wing of a given size, the weight reduction allows it to fly slower and with a lower-powered and more economical engine. For this reason, all monoplane wings in the pioneer era were braced and most were up until the early 1930s. However, the exposed struts or wires create additional drag, lowering aerodynamic efficiency and reducing the maximum speed.

High-speed and long-range designs tend to be pure cantilevers, while low-speed short-range types are often given bracing.

== Wing position ==
Besides the general variations in wing configuration such as tail position and use of bracing, the main distinction between types of monoplane is where the wing is mounted vertically on the fuselage.

=== Low ===
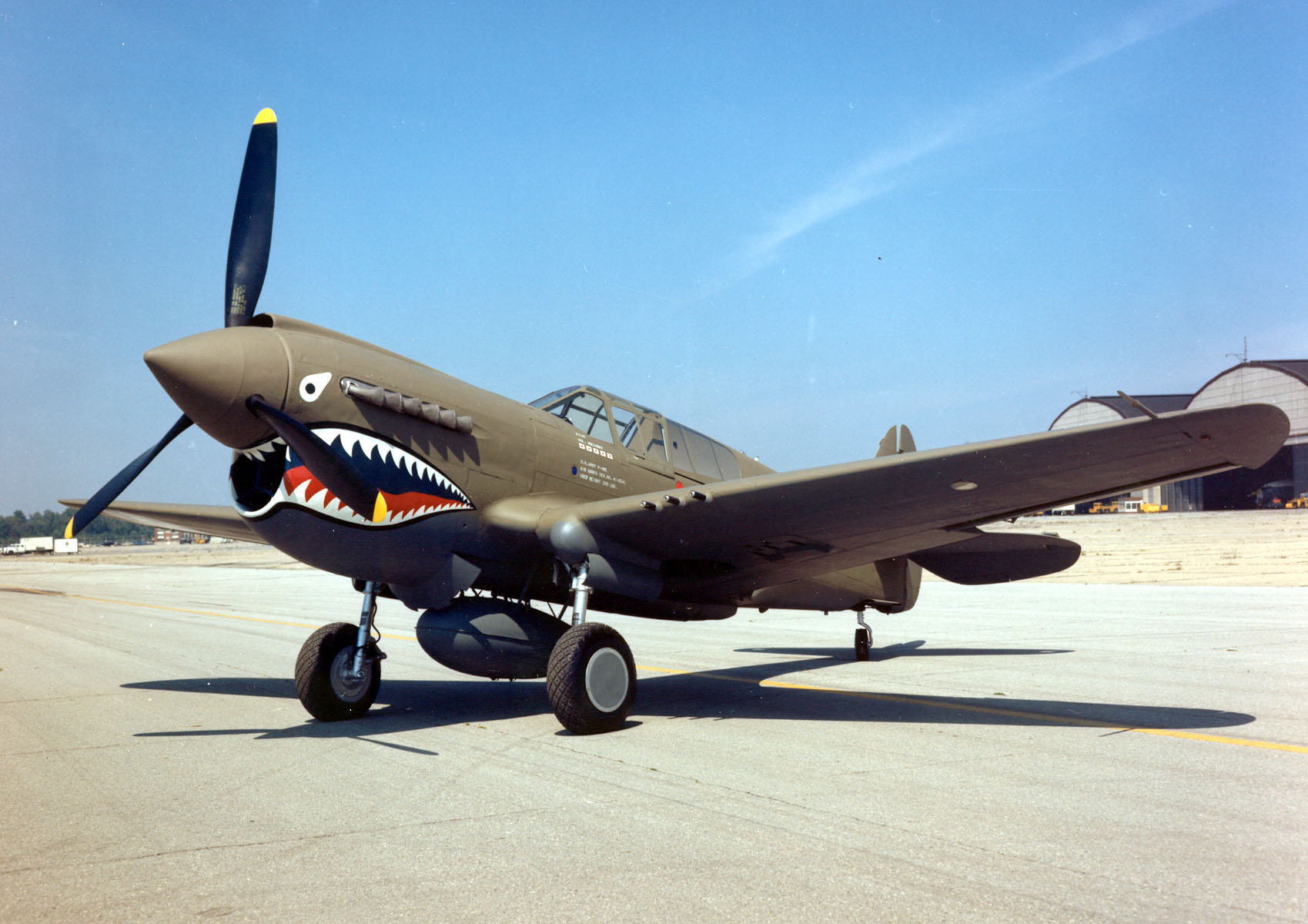
Low wing on a Curtiss P-40

A low wing is one which is located on or near the bottom of the fuselage.

Placing the wing low allows good visibility upwards and frees the central fuselage from the wing spar carry-through. By reducing pendulum stability, it makes the aircraft more maneuverable, as on the Spitfire; but aircraft that value stability over maneuverability may then need some dihedral.

A feature of the low-wing position is its significant ground effect, giving the plane a tendency to float farther before landing. Conversely, this ground effect permits shorter takeoffs.

=== Mid ===
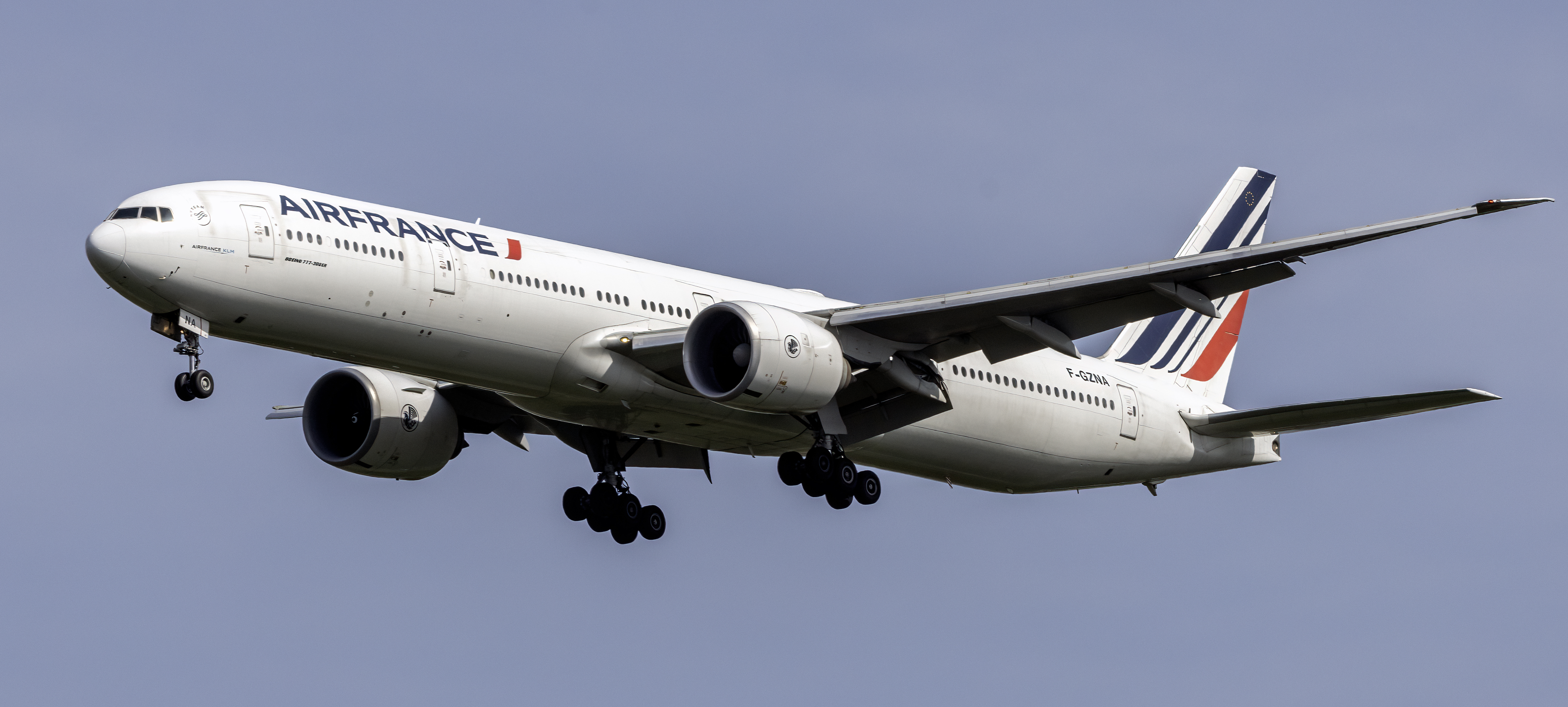
Mid wing on a Boeing 777-300ER

A mid wing is mounted midway up the fuselage. The carry-through spar structure can reduce the useful fuselage volume near its centre of gravity, where space is often in most demand.

The Mid-wing form is the most common one for large aircraft, and nearly the only one used for passenger-carrying large aircraft.

=== Shoulder ===
Shoulder wing on an ARV Super2, showing good pilot visibility

A shoulder wing (a category between high-wing and mid-wing) is a configuration whereby the wing is mounted near the top of the fuselage but not on the very top. Shoulder-wings and high-wings share some characteristics, namely: they support a pendulous fuselage which requires no wing dihedral for stability; and, by comparison with a low-wing, a shoulder-wing's limited ground effect reduces float on landing. Compared to a low-wing, shoulder-wing and high-wing configurations give increased propeller clearance on multi-engined aircraft. On a large aircraft, there is little practical difference between a shoulder wing and a high wing; but on a light aircraft, the configuration is significant because it offers superior visibility to the pilot. On light aircraft, shoulder-wings tend to be mounted further aft than a high wing, and so may need to be swept forward to maintain correct center of gravity. Examples of light aircraft with shoulder wings include the ARV Super2, the Bölkow Junior, Saab Safari and the Barber Snark.

=== High ===
A high wing has its upper surface on or above the top of the fuselage. It shares many advantages and disadvantages with the shoulder wing, but on a light aircraft, the high wing has poorer upwards visibility. On light aircraft such as the Cessna 152, the wing is usually located above the cabin, so that the wing spar passes over the occupants' heads, leaving the wing in the ideal fore-aft position. An advantage of the high-wing configuration is that the fuselage is closer to the ground which eases cargo loading, especially for aircraft with a rear-fuselage cargo door. Military cargo aircraft are predominantly high-wing designs with a rear cargo door.

=== Parasol ===
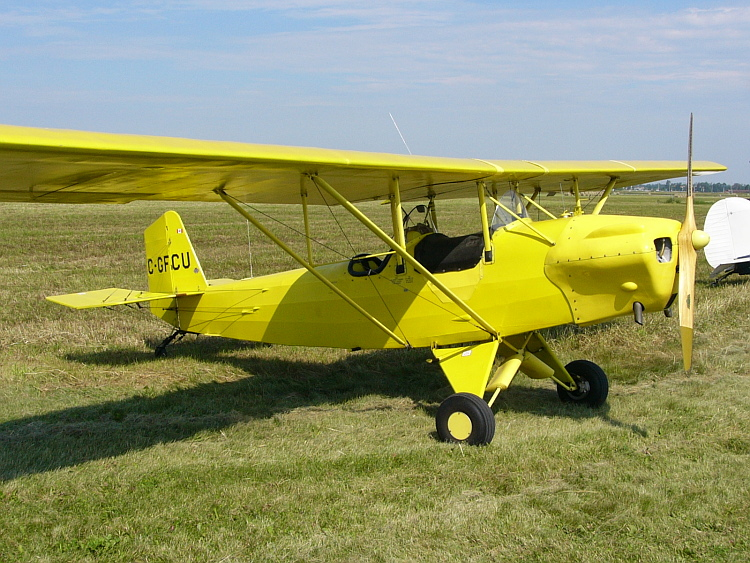
Parasol wing on a Pietenpol Air Camper

A parasol wing is not directly attached to the fuselage but held above it, supported by either cabane struts or a pylon. Additional bracing may be provided by struts or wires extending from the fuselage sides.

The first parasol monoplanes were adaptations of shoulder wing monoplanes, since raising a shoulder mounted wing above the fuselage greatly improved visibility downwards, which was useful for reconnaissance roles, as with the widely used Morane-Saulnier L. The parasol wing allows for an efficient design with good pilot visibility, and was adopted for some fighters such as the Fokker D.VIII and Morane-Saulnier AI in the later part of the First World War.

A parasol wing also provides a high mounting point for engines and during the interwar period was popular on flying boats, which need to lift the propellers clear of spray. Examples include the Martin M-130, Dornier Do 18 and the Consolidated PBY Catalina.

Compared to a biplane, a parasol wing has less bracing and lower drag. It remains a popular configuration for amphibians and small homebuilt and ultralight aircraft.

== History ==
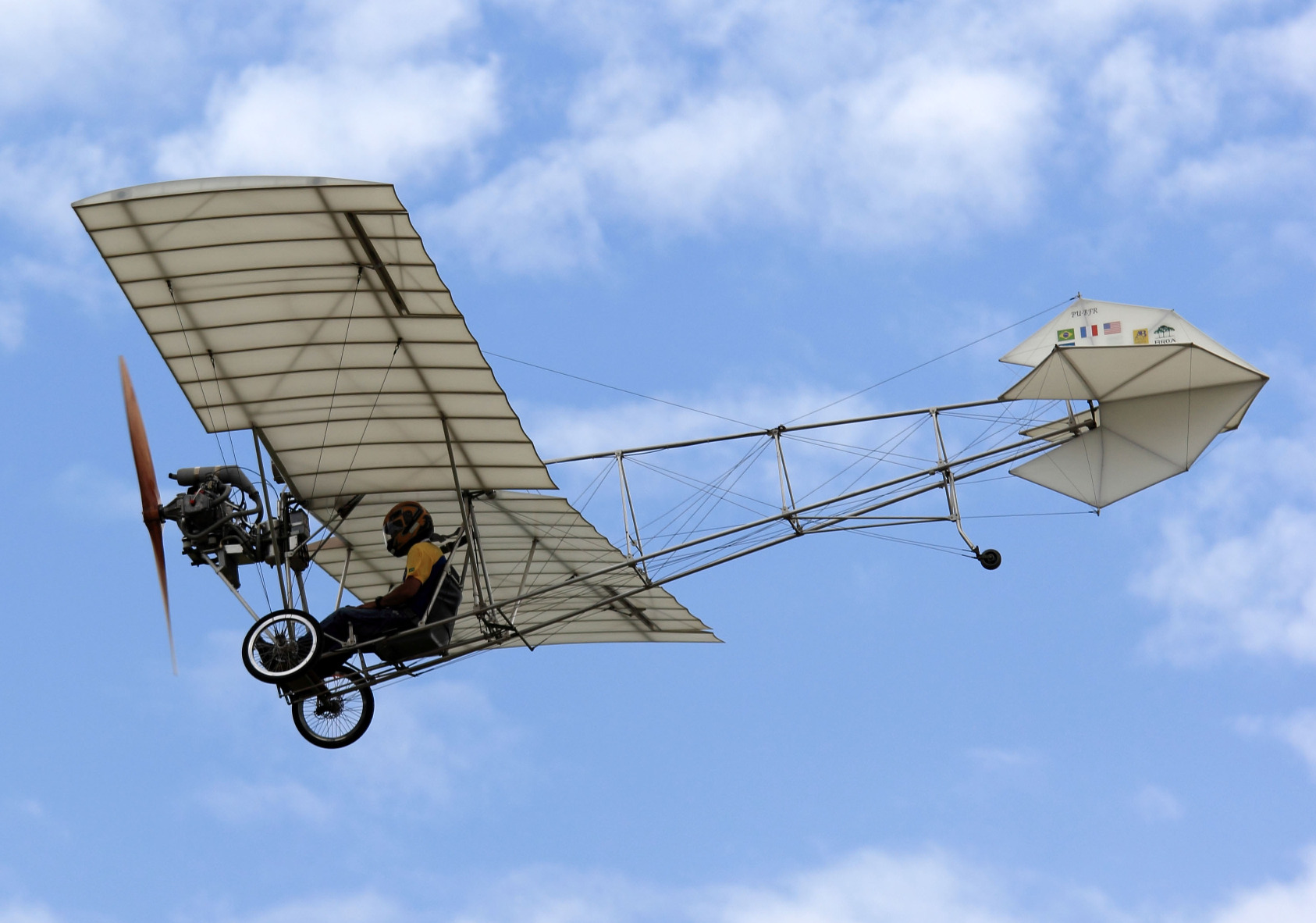
The Santos-Dumont Demoiselle was the first production monoplane (replica shown).

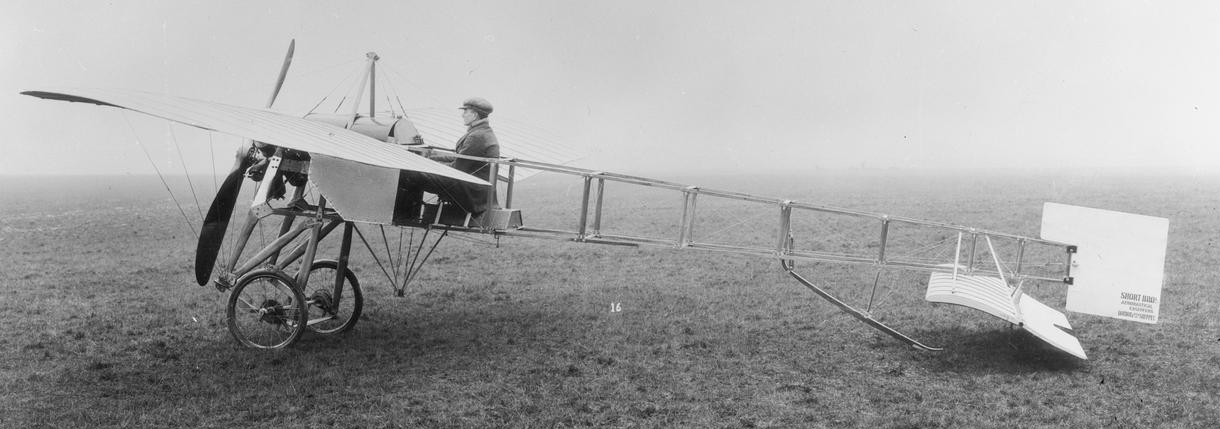
The Short Brothers' first attempt at a monoplane, 1911

Although the first successful aircraft were biplanes, the first attempts at heavier-than-air flying machines were monoplanes, and many pioneers continued to develop monoplane designs. For example, the first aeroplane to be put into production was the 1907 Santos-Dumont Demoiselle, while the Blériot XI flew across the English Channel in 1909. Throughout 1909–1910, Hubert Latham set multiple altitude records in his Antoinette IV monoplane, eventually reaching 1,384 m (4,541 ft).

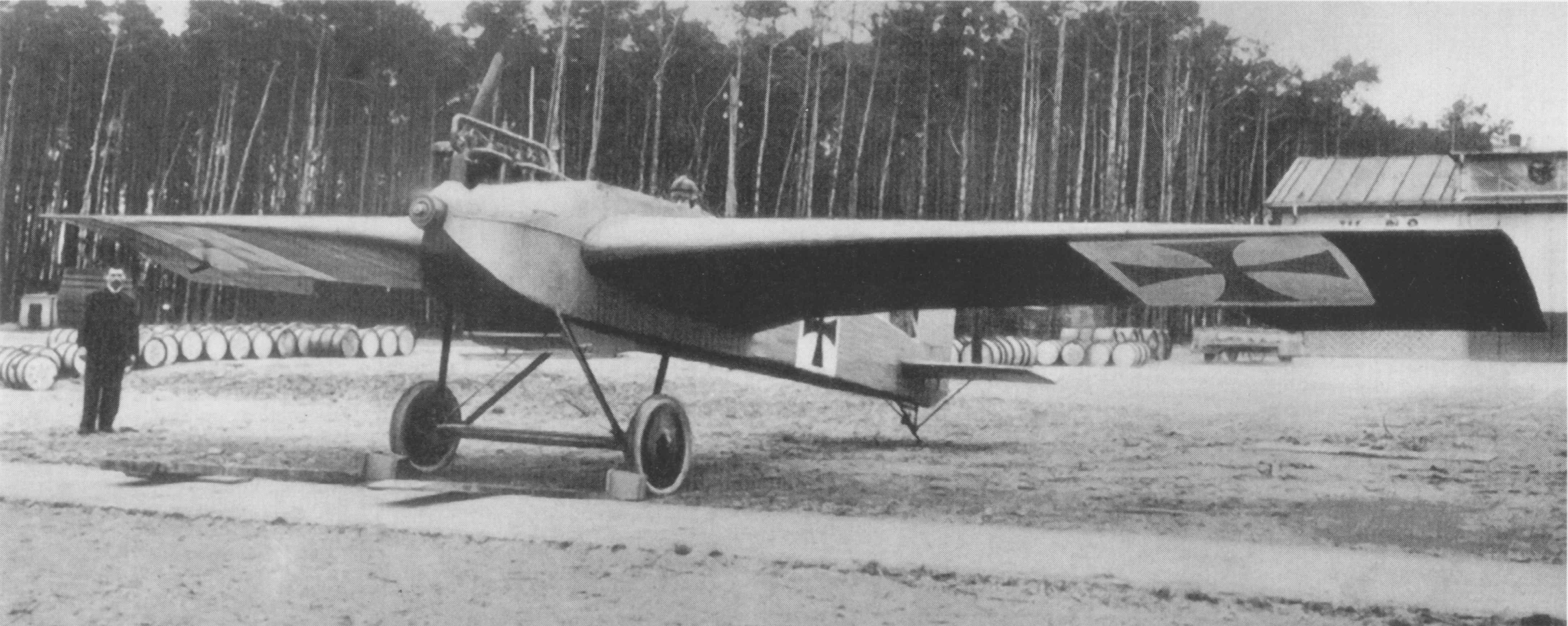
The Junkers J 1 monoplane pioneered all-metal construction in 1915.

The equivalent German language term is Eindecker, as in the mid-wing Fokker Eindecker fighter of 1915 which for a time dominated the skies in what became known as the "Fokker scourge". The German military Idflieg aircraft designation system prior to 1918 prefixed monoplane type designations with an E, until the approval of the Fokker D.VIII fighter from its former "E.V" designation. However, the success of the Fokker was short-lived, and World War I was dominated by biplanes. Towards the end of the war, the parasol monoplane became popular and successful designs were produced into the 1920s.

Nonetheless, relatively few monoplane types were built between 1914 and the late 1920s, compared with the number of biplanes. The reasons for this were primarily practical. With the low engine powers and airspeeds available, the wings of a monoplane needed to be large in order to create enough lift while a biplane could have two smaller wings and so be made smaller and lighter.

Towards the end of the First World War, the inherent high drag of the biplane was beginning to restrict performance. Engines were not yet powerful enough to make the heavy cantilever-wing monoplane viable, and the braced parasol wing became popular on fighter aircraft, although few arrived in time to see combat. It remained popular throughout the 1920s.

On flying boats with a shallow hull, a parasol wing allows the engines to be mounted above the spray from the water when taking off and landing. This arrangement was popular on flying boats during the 1930s; a late example being the Consolidated PBY Catalina. It died out when taller hulls became the norm during World War II, allowing a high wing to be attached directly to the hull.

As ever-increasing engine powers made the weight of all-metal construction and the cantilever wing more practical—first pioneered together by the revolutionary German Junkers J 1 factory demonstrator in 1915–16—they became common during the post–World War I period, the day of the braced wing passed, and by the 1930s, the cantilever monoplane was fast becoming the standard configuration for a fixed-wing aircraft. Advanced monoplane fighter-aircraft designs were mass-produced for military services around the world in both the Soviet Union and the United States in the early–mid 1930s, with the Polikarpov I-16 and the Boeing P-26 Peashooter respectively.

Most military aircraft of WWII were monoplanes, as have been virtually all aircraft since, except for a few specialist types.

Jet and rocket engines have even more power and all modern high-speed aircraft, especially supersonic types, have been monoplanes.

== See also ==
- Aspect ratio (aeronautics)
