= List of aircraft propeller manufacturers =

This is a list of current and former aircraft propeller manufacturers.

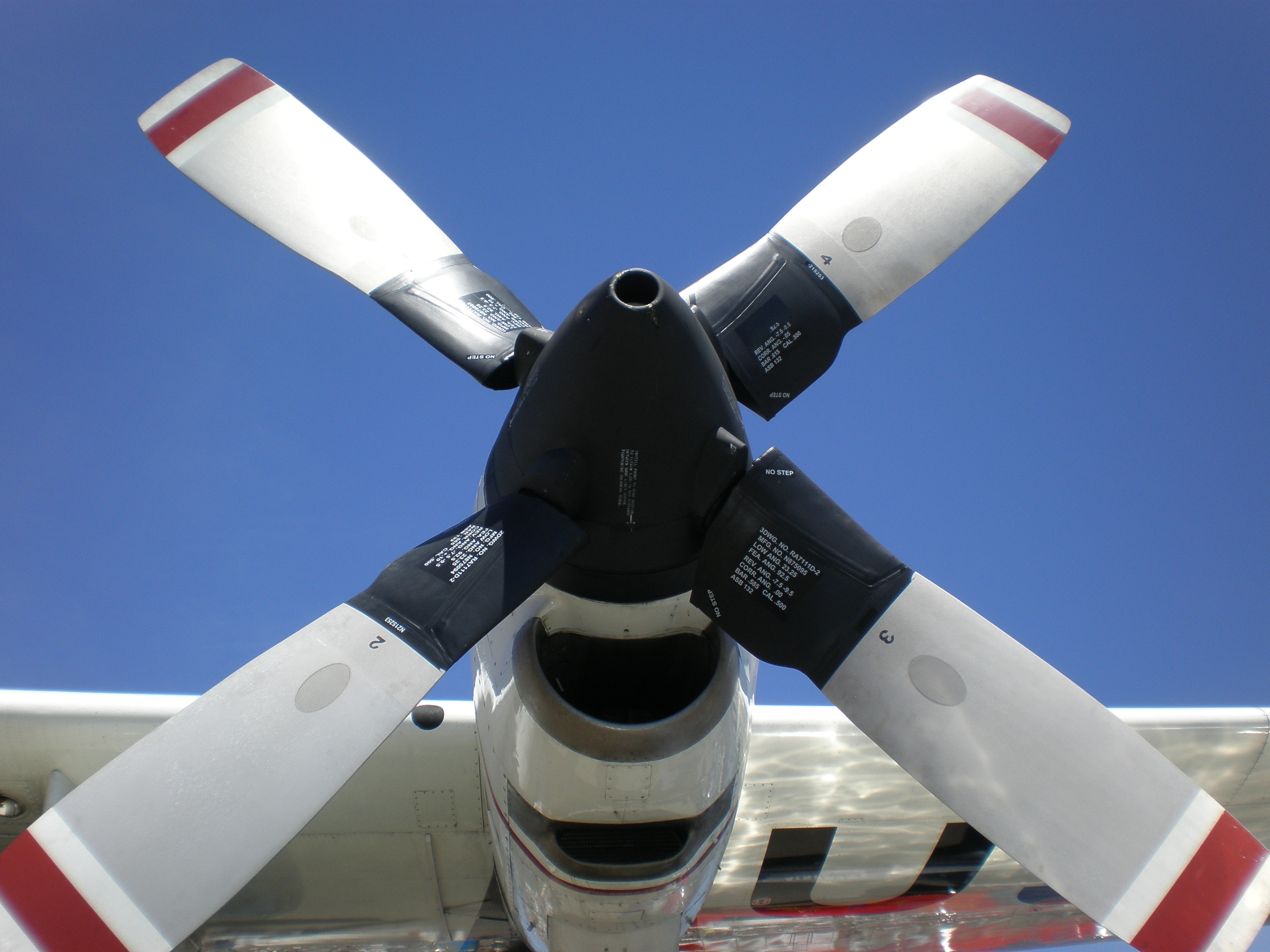
Lockheed HC-130H Hercules propeller

== A ==
- Aero Ltd. – Poland
- AeroLux Propellers – United States
- Aeroproducts – United States
- Aerosila – Russia
- Airmaster Propellers – New Zealand
- The Airscrew Company – UK
- AKS Inc – United States
- Alisport, Italy (Idrovario Propellers)
- American Propeller Manufacturing Company – United States
- Arplast Helice – France
- Aymar-DeMuth Propellers – United States
- Aurusropellers – Aurus Design S.r.l.s. – Italy
- Avia Propeller – Czech Republic
- Aviation Design & Certification – Germany
- Avtek – Italy
- Axial – German Empire

== B ==
- Banks Maxwell Propeller Company – United States
- Bellissimo Custom Propellers – Ontario, Canada
- Binder Motorenbau – Germany
- Baoding Propeller Plant – People's Republic of China
- Blackburn Aeroplane & Motor Co – UK
- Bolly Props – Australia
- Born Propeller – Germany
- British Maxim – UK
- Büttner Propeller – Germany

== C ==
- Catto Propellers – United States (1975–present)
- Chauvière – France (1905-?)
- Collins Aerospace – United States (2018–present)
- Competition Aircraft – United States (1980–present)
- Culver Props – United States
- Curtiss-Wright Corporation – United States

== D ==
- DCTA – Brazil
- de Havilland Propellers – United Kingdom (1935-1961)
- DM-Prop – Slovakia
- Dowty Rotol – United Kingdom
- Duc Hélices – France

== E ==
- EVRA – France
- Electravia – Helices E-Props – France (2008–present)

== F ==
- Fairey-Reed Propeller Company – UK
- Fahlin Manufacturing Company – United States
- The Falcon Airscrew Company – UK
- Falter (Shäfer) Propellerin – Germany
- Felix Propellers – United States
- Finish – Russia

== G ==
- Garuda – German Empire
- GE Aviation Systems – UK
- GEFA-flug – Germany
- Geiger Engineering – Germany
- Gloster Aircraft – UK
- GSC Systems – Canada (1984–present)
- GT Propellers – Italy

== H ==
- Haw Propeller – Germany
- Helices E-PROPS – Electravia – France (2008–present)
- Hélices Halter – France (1987-2014)
- Hamilton Standard – United States (1929-1999)
- Hamilton Sundstrand – United States (1999-2012)
- Hartzell Propeller – United States (1917–present)
- Hegy Propellers – United States
- Heine Propellers – Germany
- Helix-Carbon – Germany
- Hercules Propellers – UK
- F. Hills & Sons – UK
- Historic Propellers – Czech Republic (2012 – present)
- Hoffmann Propeller – Germany (1955–present)
- Hordern-Richmond – UK (1937-circa 1990)

== I ==
- Idrovario Propellers, made by Alisport, Italy
- Ipswich Propellers – UK
- Ivoprop – USA
- IPT – Brazil (? – 1996)

== J ==
- Jablo – UK
- Junkers – Germany (Third Reich)
- Junkers Profly – Germany

== K ==
- Kasparaero – Czech Republic
- KievProp – Ukraine

== L ==
- Lang Propellers – UK
- Lange Aviation – Germany
- LOM Praha – Czech Republic

== M ==
- McCauley Propeller Systems – United States (1938–present)
- The Metal Airscrew Company – UK (-1927)
- Metal Propellers – UK
- Mejzlik Propellers – Czech Republic
- MT-Propeller – Germany (1980–present)
- MW Propellers – United States

== N ==
- Neuform Composites – Germany
- NeuraJet – Austria
- The Normal Propeller Company – UK

== O ==
- W. D. Oddy & Company – UK

== P ==
- P & K Enterprises – United States
- Pacesetter Propeller Works – United States
- PE Aero – Ukraine
- Performance Propellers – United States
- Precision Propellers – United States
- Peszke Aero Technologies – Poland
- Établissements Poncelet – Belgium
- Powerfin – United States
- Prince Aircraft – United States (1979–present)
- Props Inc – United States (1985–present)
- PropTec Hélices – Brazil (2006–present) – Aeronautical, Naval and Eolic Turbine Blades
- G. Proctor & Son – UK
- PZL Warszawa – Poland

== Q ==
- Quinti Avio – Italy

== R ==
- Ratier Figeac – France
- Reed Propeller Co. – United States
- Rospeller GmbH – Germany
- Rotol – United Kingdom (1943-1958)
- Rotol Airscrews – United Kingdom (1937-1943)
- Rupert Aeronaves – Brazil

== S ==
- S&S Aircraft – Canada
- Schleicher – Germany
- Seabird Aviation Australia – Australia
- Sensenich Propeller Manufacturing Company – United States
- Sensenich Wood Propeller Company – United States
- Sportine Aviacija ir Ko – Lithuania
- Sport Prop – Czech Republic
- Sterba Propellers – United States
- Sterna Propellers – United States
- Sun Flightcraft – Austria
- Szomański

== T ==
- Tarver Propellers – United States
- Tennessee Propellers – United States

== U ==
- UTC Aerospace Systems – United States (2012–2018)

== V ==
- Václav Stržínek – Czech Republic (2012 – present)
- Vari-Prop – United States
- Hélices Valax – France
- Vereinigte Deutsche Metallwerke (VDM) – Germany (Third Reich)
- Vpered Moscow Machine Building Plant – Russia
- VZLU – Czech Republic

== W ==
- Bernie Warnke Propellers – United States
- Warp Drive Inc – United States
- Whirl Wind Propellers – United States
- Woodcomp – Czech Republic
- Wotan – German Empire
