= Silence Twister =

Twister 1100
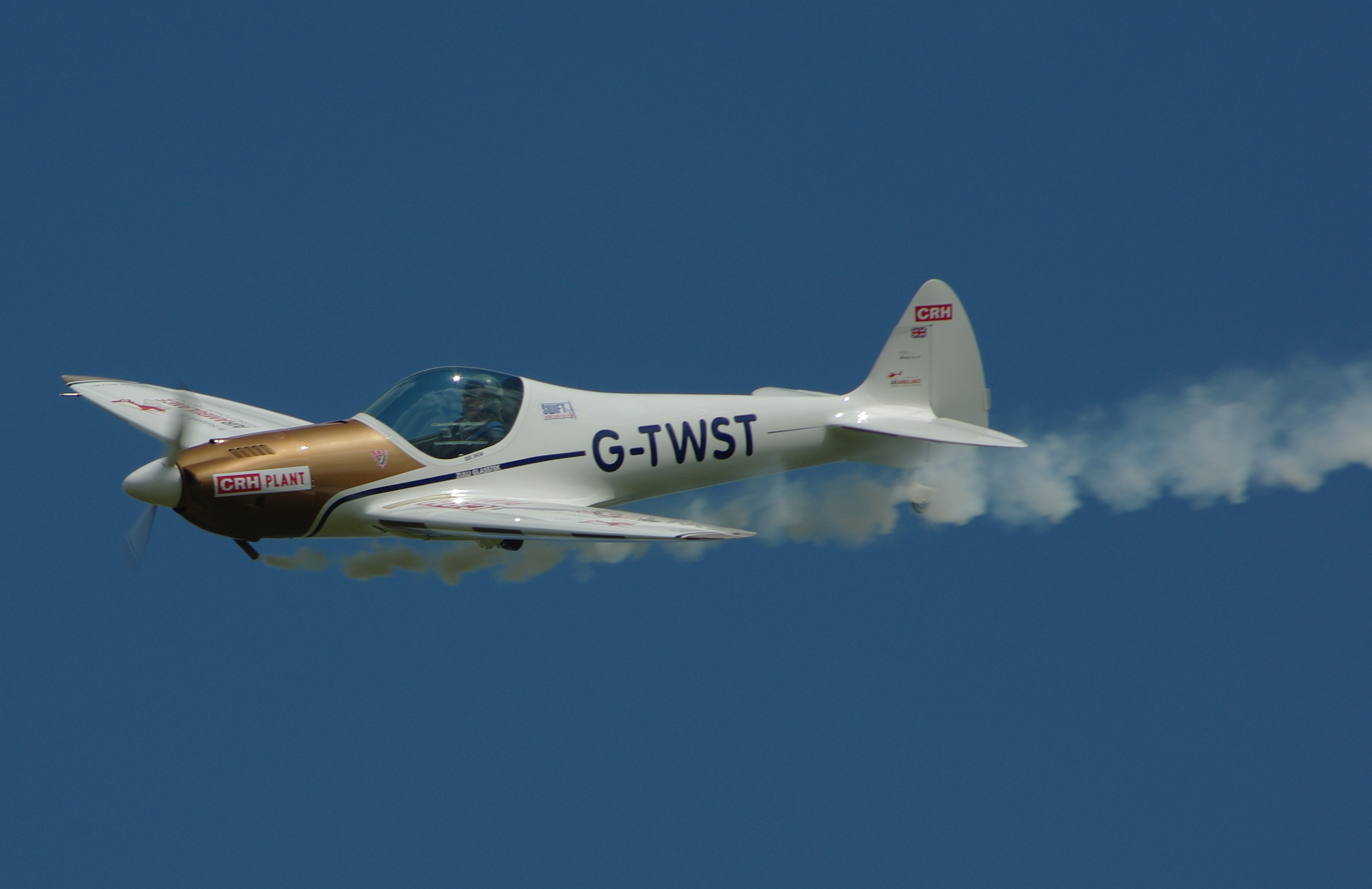
- Silence Twister on display at Old Warden airfield

General information
- Type: Single-seat ultralight homebuilt monoplane
- National origin: Germany
- Manufacturer: Silence Aircraft
- Status: In production (2013)
- Number built: 21 (2011)

History
- First flight: 30 September 2000
- Developed from: Technically not developed from, but inspired by the Supermarine Spitfire

The Silence Twister is a German ultralight designed by Silence Aircraft for amateur construction, either from plans or kits. The prototype first flew on 30 September 2000.

== Design and development ==
The Twister is a single-seat low-wing monoplane with elliptical wings and tailplane. It has a retractable conventional landing gear with a fixed tailwheel. The design drew inspiration from the Supermarine Spitfire, and the shapes of the Twister's wings, fin and tailplane all recall the famous World War II fighter. Designed to take engines up to 94 hp (70 kW), the prototype was fitted with a 53.6 hp (40 kW) single-rotor MidWest Wankel engine. This compact rotary motor allowed a sleek engine cowling, but the engine was rejected and production aircraft use 85 hp (63 kW) Jabiru 2200 or 95 hp (71 kW) ULPower UL260i engines.

An electric aircraft version was under development in 2010.

=== Propeller ===
The Twister prototype was fitted with Silence Aircraft's own automatic variable-pitch propeller called the "VProp". The LAA have yet to allow the VProp to be fitted on UK aircraft, so UK Twisters have fixed-blade propellers instead.

== Operational history ==
Twenty-one examples had been completed and flown by December 2011.

== Variants ==
SA155
Initial prototype powered by a 34 kW (45 hp) MidWest AE50 Wankel rotary engine. The second prototype was powered by a 34 kW (45 hp) Diamond AE50 engine.
SA180
powered by a 60 kW (80 hp) Jabiru 2200 engine.
Akron
A version developed for the US market under Experimental aircraft certification rules.

== Specifications (Prototype) ==
Data from Jane's All the World's Aircraft 2004-05.

General characteristics

- Crew: 1
- Length: 6.18 m (20 ft 3 in)
- Wingspan: 7.5 m (24 ft 7 in)
- Height: 1.44 m (4 ft 9 in)
- Wing area: 8.72 m^{2} (93.9 sq ft)
- Airfoil: Stuttgart LWK180/25
- Empty weight: 200 kg (441 lb)
- Max takeoff weight: 340 kg (750 lb)
- Fuel capacity: 80 L (21 US gal; 18 imp gal) (75 L (20 US gal; 16 imp gal) usable)
- Powerplant: 1 × MidWest AE50 Wankel rotary engine, 40 kW (54 hp)
- Propellers: 2-bladed Silence V-Prop automatic variable-pitch propeller

Performance

- Cruise speed: 200 km/h (120 mph, 110 kn)
- Stall speed: 65 km/h (40 mph, 35 kn)
- Never exceed speed: 300 km/h (190 mph, 160 kn)
- Range: 1,300 km (810 mi, 700 nmi) max fuel
- g limits: +6/-4
- Rate of climb: 5.50 m/s (1,083 ft/min) at sea level
- Junkers ProFly ballistic recovery parachute

== See also ==
- Flight Team Twister, a different aircraft with the same model name
