= Pacesetter Propeller Works =

American aircraft propeller manufacturer

- Industry: Aerospace
- Fate: Out of business
- Headquarters: Hillsboro, Oregon, United States
- Products: Aircraft propellers

Pacesetter Propeller Works, Limited was an American manufacturer of propellers for homebuilt and ultralight aircraft. The company headquarters was located in Hillsboro, Oregon.

The company produced propellers that have been used on Van's Aircraft RV-3s, RV-4s, RV-6s, Glasairs, Mustang Aeronautics Mustang IIs, Mustang Aeronautics Midget Mustangs and Thorpe T-18s.

== See also ==
- List of aircraft propeller manufacturers
