= AKS Inc =

Defunct American propeller manufacturer

- Industry: Aerospace
- Fate: Out of business
- Headquarters: Portland, Oregon, United States
- Products: Aircraft propellers

AKS Inc, was an American manufacturer of composite aircraft propellers. The company was based in Portland, Oregon

The company produced two lines of ground adjustable propellers, the Techno Prop intended for use on small four stroke engines such and the Rotax 912 and 914 and the Sport Prop for smaller engines, including the two-stroke Rotax 503 and the four-stroke HKS 700E. The Techno Prop was available in two or three blade models and in diameters of 52 in (132 cm) and 63 in (160 cm). The Sport Prop was built in two, three and four-bladed models and came in diameters of 62 in (157 cm), 66 in (168 cm) and 68 in (173 cm).

== See also ==
- List of aircraft propeller manufacturers
