= Variable-pitch propeller (aeronautics) =

Propeller with blades that can be rotated to control their pitch while in use

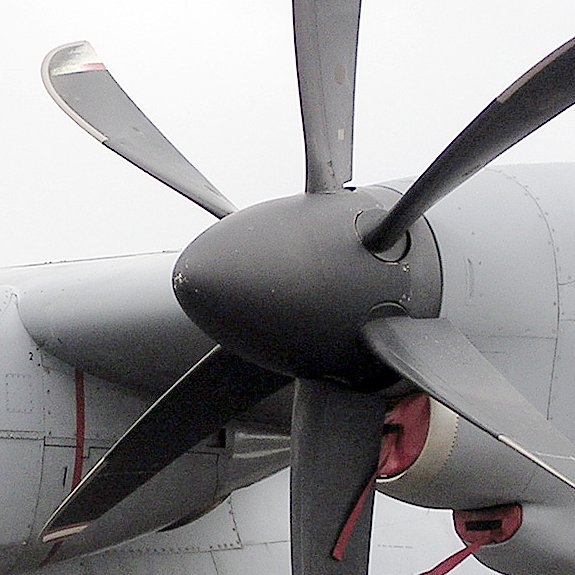
Dowty Rotol R391 six-blade composite controllable- and reversible-pitch propeller of a C-130J Super Hercules

In aeronautics, a variable-pitch propeller is a type of propeller (airscrew) with blades that can be rotated around their long axis to change the blade pitch. A controllable-pitch propeller is one where the pitch is controlled manually by the pilot. Alternatively, a constant-speed propeller is one where the pilot sets the desired engine speed (typically expressed as RPM), and the blade pitch is controlled automatically without the pilot's intervention so that the rotational speed remains constant. The device which controls the propeller pitch and thus speed is called a propeller governor or constant speed unit.

Reversible propellers are those where the pitch can be set to negative values. This creates reverse thrust for braking or going backwards without the need to change the direction of shaft revolution.

While some aircraft have ground-adjustable propellers, these are not considered variable-pitch. These are typically found only on light aircraft and microlights.

== Purpose ==
When an aircraft is stationary with the propeller spinning (in calm air), the relative wind vector for each propeller blade is from the side. However, as the aircraft starts to move forward, the relative wind vector comes increasingly from the front. The propeller blade pitch must be increased to maintain optimum angle of attack to the relative wind.

The first propellers were fixed-pitch, but these propellers are not efficient over a range of conditions. If the propeller blade angle is set to give good takeoff and climb performance, the propeller will be inefficient in cruising flight because the blade will be at too low an angle of attack. In contrast, a propeller set for good cruise performance may stall at low speeds, because the angle of attack is too high.

A propeller with adjustable blade angle is more efficient over a range of conditions. A propeller with variable pitch can have a nearly constant efficiency over a range of airspeeds.

A shallower angle of attack requires the least torque, but the highest RPM, because the propeller is not moving very much air with each revolution. This is similar to a car operating in low gear. When the motorist reaches cruising speed, they will slow down the engine by shifting into a higher gear, while still producing enough power to keep the vehicle moving. This is accomplished in an airplane by increasing the angle of attack of the propeller. This means that the propeller moves more air per revolution and allows the engine to spin slower while moving an equivalent volume of air, thus maintaining velocity.

Another use of variable-pitch propellers is to feather the blades of the propeller, in order to reduce drag. This means to rotate the blades so that their leading edges face directly forwards. In a multi-engine aircraft, if one engine fails, it can be feathered to reduce drag so that the aircraft can continue flying using the other engine(s). In a single-engine aircraft, if the engine fails, feathering the propeller will reduce drag and increase glide distance, providing the pilot with more options for the location of a forced landing.

== Mechanisms ==
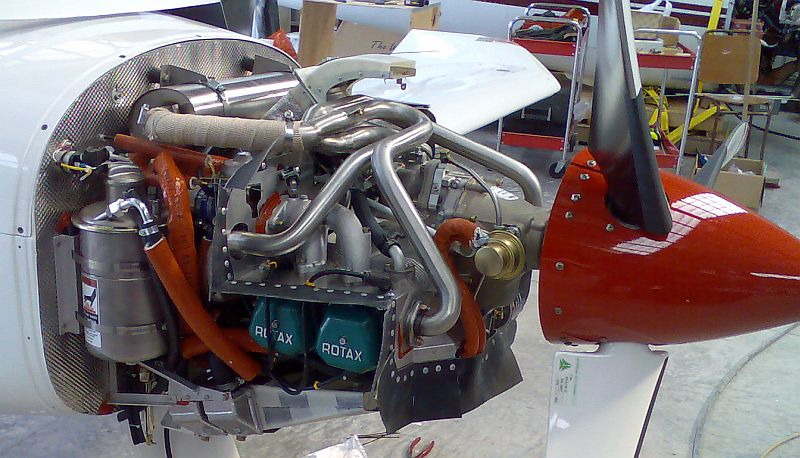
A hydraulic constant-speed propeller on a Rotax 912S engine in a Dyn'Aéro MCR01 Microlight aircraft

Three methods are used to vary the pitch: oil pressure, centrifugal weights, or electro-mechanical control.

Engine oil pressure is the usual mechanism used in commercial propeller aircraft and the Continental and Lycoming engines fitted to light aircraft. In aircraft without a constant speed unit (CSU), the pilot controls the propeller blade pitch manually, using oil pressure.

Alternatively, or additionally, centrifugal weights may be attached directly to the propeller as in the Yakovlev Yak-52. The first attempts at constant-speed propellers were called counterweight propellers, which were driven by mechanisms that operated on centrifugal force. Their operation is identical to the centrifugal governor used by James Watt to limit the speed of steam engines. Eccentric weights were set up near or in the spinner, held in by a spring. When the propeller reached a certain RPM, centrifugal force would cause the weights to swing outwards, which would drive a mechanism that twisted the propeller into a steeper pitch. When the propeller slowed, the RPM would decrease enough for the spring to push the weights back in, realigning the propeller to the shallower pitch.

Small, modern engines with constant speed units (CSUs), such as the Rotax 912, may use either the conventional hydraulic method or an electrical pitch control mechanism.

Hydraulic operation can be too expensive and bulky for microlights. Instead, these may use propellers that are activated mechanically or electrically.

=== Constant-speed propellers ===
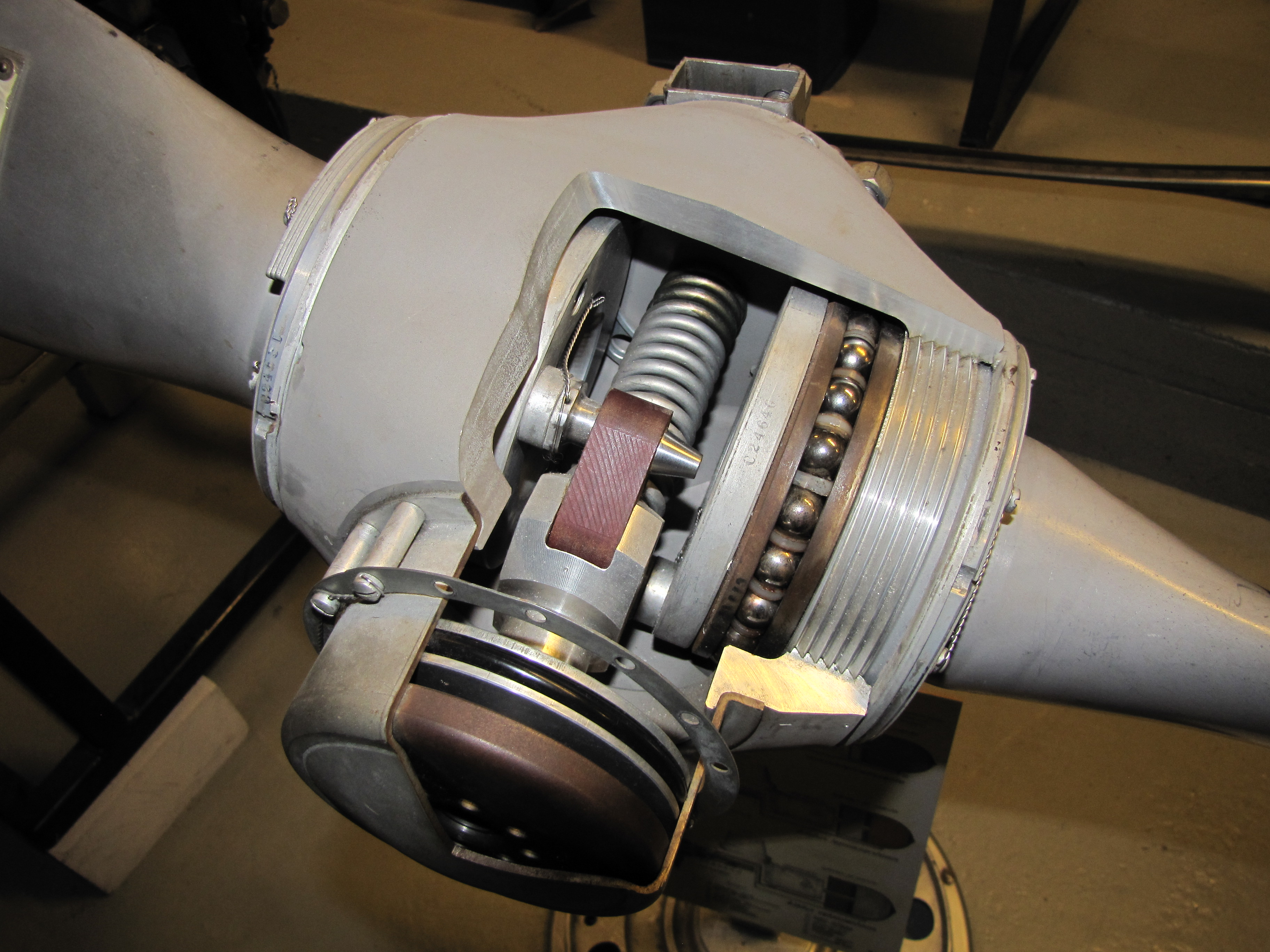
Cutaway constant-speed propeller hub

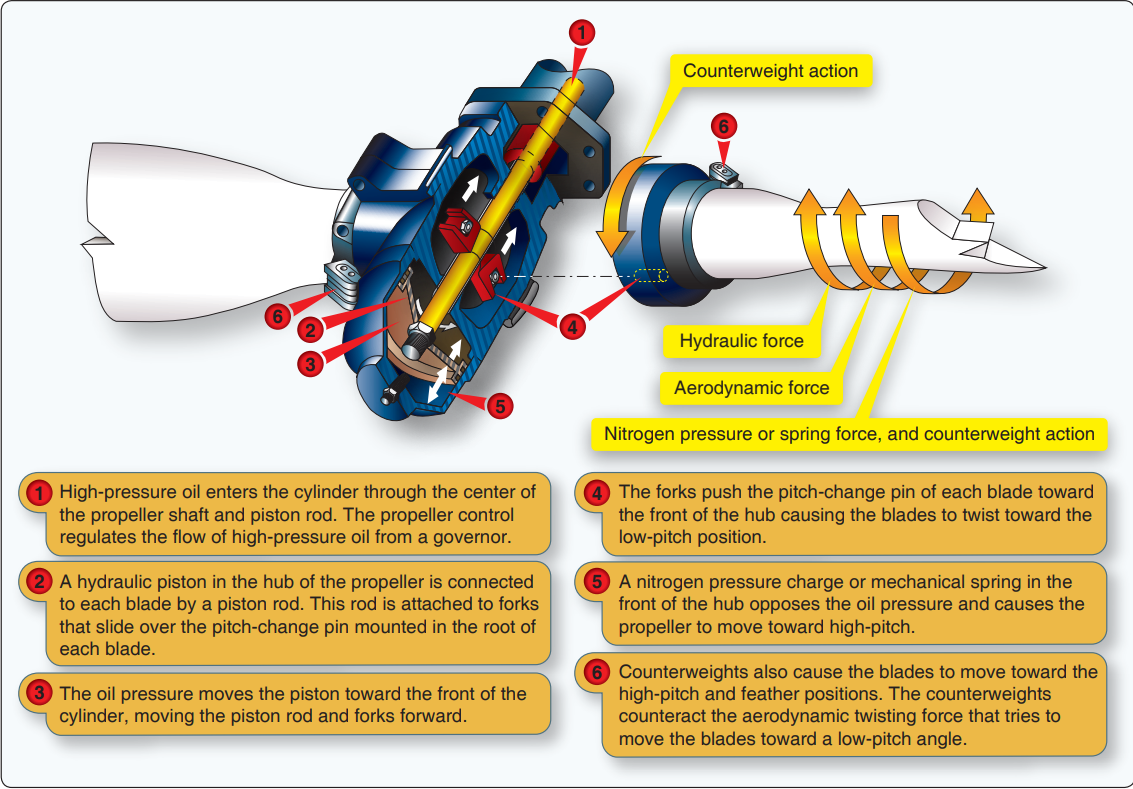
Pitch-change forces on a constant-speed propeller

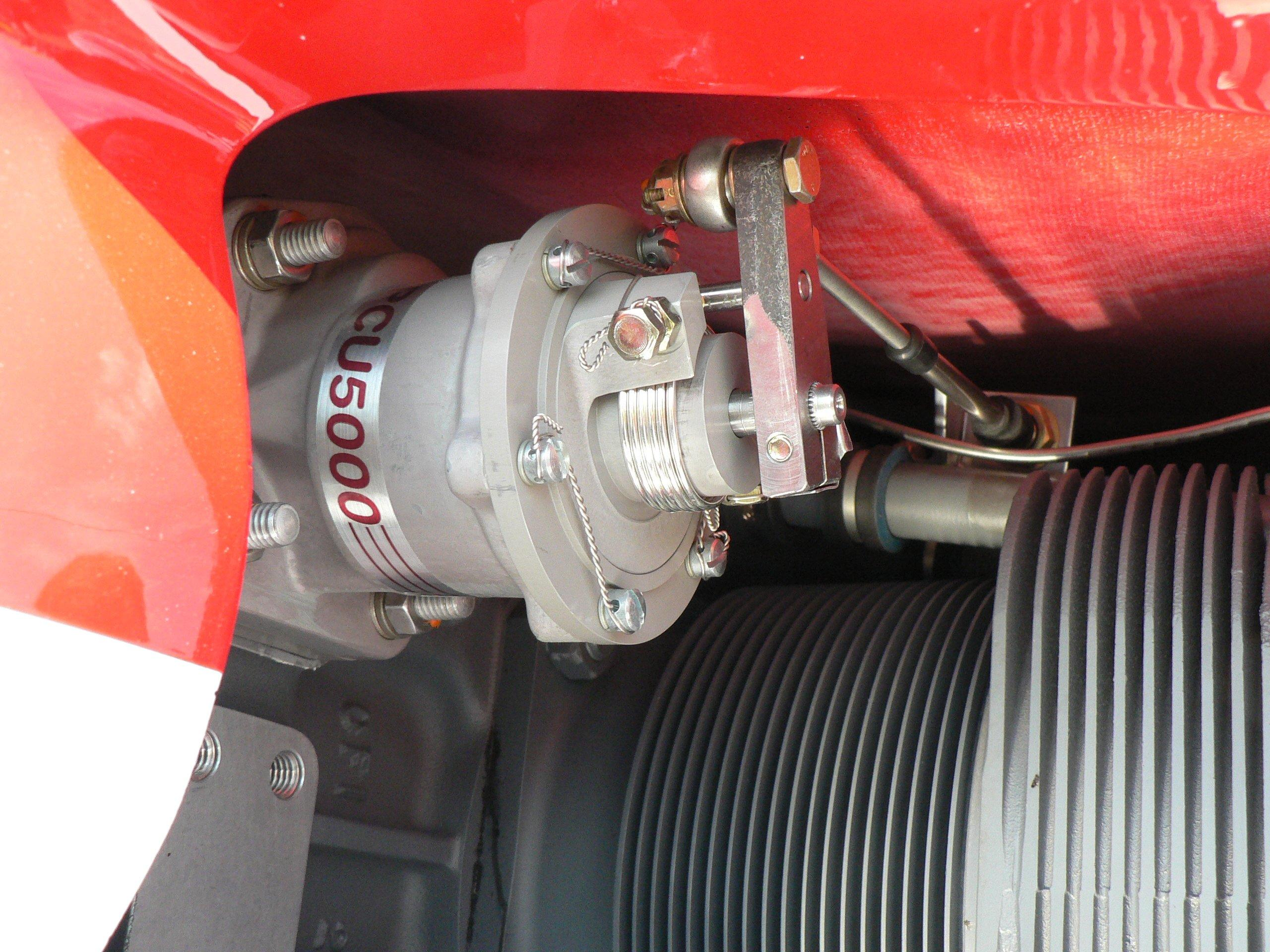
Propeller governor PCU5000, made by Jihostroj a.s. company, fitted to an American Champion aircraft

A constant-speed propeller is a type of variable-pitch propeller designed to automatically change its blade pitch while maintaining a set rotational speed, regardless of the operational conditions of the aircraft. This is achieved by use of a constant-speed unit (CSU), or propeller governor, built integral to the propeller hub.

Most engines produce their maximum power in a narrow speed band. The CSU allows the engine to operate in its most economical range of rotational speeds regardless of whether the aircraft is taking off or cruising. The CSU can be said to be to an aircraft what the continuously variable transmission is to the motorcar: the engine can be kept running at its optimum speed regardless of the speed at which the aircraft is flying through the air. The CSU also allows aircraft engine designers to keep the ignition system simple: the automatic spark advance seen in motor vehicle engines is simplified because aircraft engines run at roughly constant rotational speed.

Virtually all high-performance propeller-driven aircraft have constant-speed propellers, as they greatly improve fuel efficiency and performance, especially at high altitude.

The first attempts at constant-speed propellers were called counterweight propellers, which were driven by mechanisms that operated on centrifugal force. Their operation is identical to the centrifugal governor used by James Watt to control the speed of steam engines. Eccentric weights were set up near or in the spinner, held in by a spring. When the propeller reached a certain RPM, centrifugal force would cause the weights to swing outwards, which would drive a mechanism that twisted the propeller into a steeper pitch. When the propeller slowed, the RPM would decrease enough for the spring to push the weights back in, realigning the propeller to the shallower pitch.

Most CSUs use oil pressure to control propeller pitch. Typically, constant-speed units on a single-engine aircraft use oil pressure to increase the pitch. If the CSU fails, the propeller will automatically return to fine pitch, allowing the aircraft to be operated at lower speeds. By contrast, on a multi-engine aircraft, the CSU will typically use oil pressure to decrease the pitch. That way, if the CSU fails, that propeller will automatically feather, reducing drag, while the aircraft continues to be flown on the good engine. An "unfeathering accumulator" will enable such a propeller to return to fine pitch for an in-flight engine restart.

Operation in a single engine reciprocating aircraft is as follows: Engine oil is pumped through the propeller shaft by the governor to push on a piston that drives the mechanism to change pitch. The flow of oil and the pitch are controlled by a governor, consisting of a gear type pump speeder spring, flyweights, and a pilot valve. The gear type pump takes engine oil pressure and turns it to a higher pressure which is in turn controlled in an out of the propeller hub by the pilot valve, which is connected to the flyweights, and a seeder spring which presses against the flyweights. The tension of the spring is set by the propeller control lever, which sets the RPM. The governor will maintain that RPM setting until an engine overspeed or underspeed condition exists. When an overspeed condition occurs, the propeller begins to rotate faster than the desired RPM setting. This would occur as the plane descends and airspeed increases. The flyweights begin to pull outward due to centrifugal force which further compresses the speeder spring, which in turn ports oil to the hub back to the engine, decreasing engine rpm and increasing pitch. When an underspeed condition occurs, such as a climb with a loss of airspeed, the opposite takes place. The airspeed decreases, causing the propeller to slow down. This will cause the flyweights to move inward due to a lack in centrifugal force, and tension will be released from the speeder spring, porting oil out of the propeller hub, decreasing pitch and increasing rpm. This process usually takes place frequently throughout flight.

A pilot requires some additional training and, in most jurisdictions, a formal sign-off before being allowed to fly aircraft fitted with a CSU. CSUs are not allowed to be fitted to aircraft certified under light-sport aircraft regulations in the United States.

== History ==
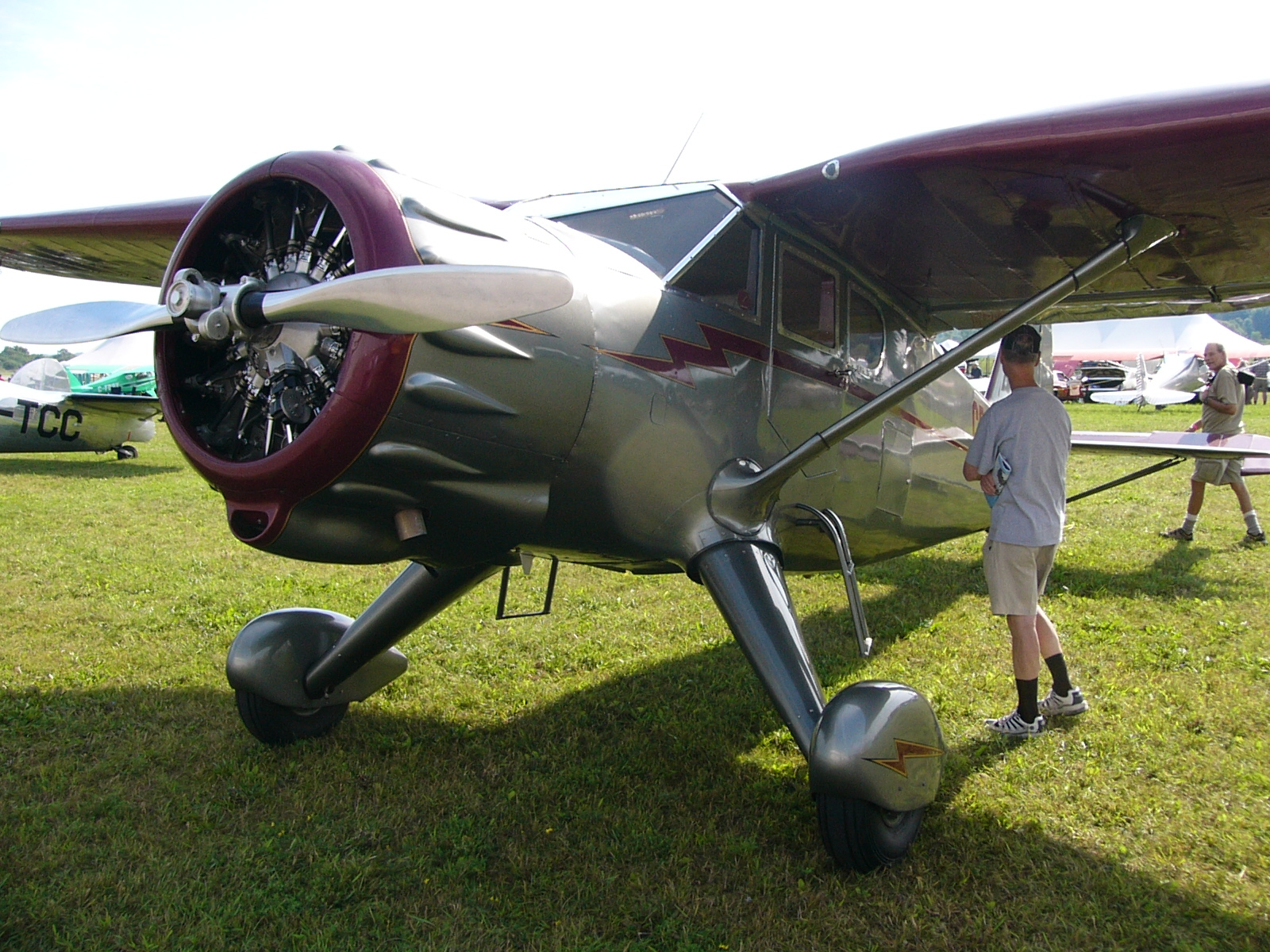
A Hamilton Standard variable-pitch propeller on a 1943 model Stinson V77 Reliant

A number of early aviation pioneers, including A. V. Roe and Louis Breguet, used propellers which could be adjusted while the aircraft was on the ground. This was also the case during World War I with one testbed example, "R.30/16", of the Zeppelin-Staaken R.VI German four-engined heavy bomber.

In 1919 L. E. Baynes patented the first automatic variable-pitch airscrew. Wallace Rupert Turnbull of Saint John, New Brunswick, Canada is credited in Canada for creating the first variable pitch propeller in 1918.

The French aircraft firm Levasseur displayed a variable-pitch propeller at the 1921 Paris Air Show. The firm claimed that the French government had tested the device in a ten-hour run and that it could change pitch at any engine RPM.

Dr Henry Selby Hele-Shaw and T.E. Beacham patented a hydraulically-operated variable-pitch propeller (based on a variable-stroke pump) in 1924 and presented a paper on the subject before the Royal Aeronautical Society in 1928; it met with scepticism as to its utility. The propeller had been developed with Gloster Aircraft Company as the Gloster Hele-Shaw Beacham Variable Pitch propeller and was demonstrated on a Gloster Grebe, where it was used to maintain a near-constant RPM.

The French firm Ratier produced variable-pitch propellers of various designs from 1928 onwards, relying on a special ball-bearing helicoidal ramp at the root of the blades for easy operation. Walter S Hoover's patent for a variable pitch propeller was filed in the U.S. Patent Office in 1934.

Several designs were tried, including a small bladder of pressurized air in the propeller hub providing the necessary force to resist a spring that would drive the blades from fine pitch (take-off) to coarse pitch (level cruising). At a suitable airspeed a disk on the front of the spinner would press sufficiently on the bladder's air-release valve to relieve the pressure and allow the spring to drive the propeller to coarse pitch. These "pneumatic" propellers were fitted on the de Havilland DH.88 Comet aircraft, winner of the famed long-distance 1934 MacRobertson Air Race and in the Caudron C.460 winner of the 1936 National Air Races, flown by Michel Détroyat. Use of these pneumatic propellers required presetting the propeller to fine pitch prior to take-off. This was done by pressurizing the bladder with a bicycle pump, hence the whimsical nickname Gonfleurs d'hélices (prop-inflater boys) given to the aircraft ground-mechanics in France up to this day.

A Gloster Hele-Shaw hydraulic propeller was shown at the 1929 International Aero Exhibition at Olympia. American Tom Hamilton of the Hamilton Aero Manufacturing Company saw it and, on returning home, patented it there. As the Hamilton Standard Division of the United Aircraft Company, engineer Frank W. Caldwell developed a hydraulic design, which led to the award of the Collier Trophy of 1933. de Havilland subsequently bought up the rights to produce Hamilton propellers in the UK, while Rolls-Royce and Bristol Engines formed the British company Rotol in 1937 to produce their own designs. The French company of Pierre Levasseur and Smith Engineering Co. in the United States also developed controllable-pitch propellers. Wiley Post (1898–1935) used Smith propellers on some of his flights.

Another electrically-operated mechanism was developed by Wallace Turnbull and refined by the Curtiss-Wright Corporation. This was first tested in on June 6, 1927, at Camp Borden, Ontario, Canada and received a patent in 1929 (U.S. patent 1,828,348). Some pilots in World War II (1939–1945) favoured it, because even when the engine was no longer running the propeller could be feathered. On hydraulically-operated propellers the feathering had to happen before the loss of hydraulic pressure in the engine, unless a dedicated electrically-operated feathering pump was installed to provide the necessary oil pressure to feather the propeller.

== See also ==
- Variable-pitch propeller (marine)
- Propeller (aeronautics)
- Gear pump
- Governor (device)
- V-Prop
