= Flap rudder =

Marine rudder with a trailing edge flap

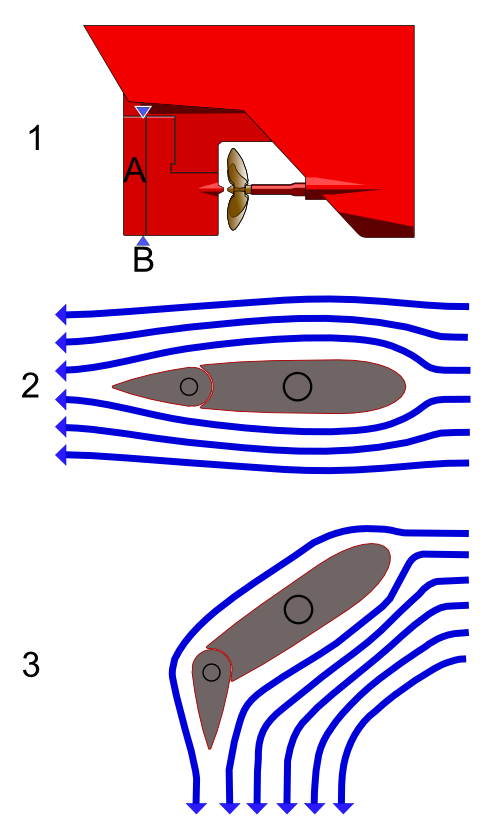
Rudder system with additional flap. Diagrams of water flow and straight-ahead position and starboard rudder.

A Flap Rudder (aka a "Becker rudder") is a specific type of multi-section rudder used on boats and ships. The hinged aft section gives the rudder an extra control surface, enhancing its efficiency.

According to Kongsberg "A flap rudder produces more side force than a classic rudder of equivalent size. Depending on shipowner requirements, a flap rudder may be used to reduce the overall area of a rudder whilst maintaining equal lift forces".

According to the aerofoil theory, two wings with the same chord length and aspect ratio, one of which is a curved wing with camber and the other is a wing of symmetrical section, at the same angle of attack, the lift of the former is greater than that of the latter.

== Design ==
The flap rudder is designed to improve the effective lift generated by the rudder and hence improve the manoeuvrability of the craft.

The rudder consists of two or more sections which move relative to each other as helm is applied and the angle of the main or driven section moves, thus the shape of the rudder changes dynamically as the angle of helm is changed.

In a two-part flap rudder, the aft part (the "flap") pivots back towards the centreline, thus producing a more hydrodynamic cross-section which increases lift and reduces the chance of stalling.

Although a flap rudder is more compact than a conventional rudder, it has the disadvantage of extra cost and more moving parts. Arguably, on a ship or boat, most of the benefits of a flap rudder may be achieved by the simpler one-piece Schilling rudder.

== See also ==
- Schilling rudder – Low aspect ratio rudder with endplates
- Azimuth thruster – Steerable propulsion pod under a watercraft
- Ducted propeller – Marine propeller with a non-rotating nozzle
- Kitchen rudder – Type of directional propulsion system for vessels
- Pleuger rudder – Thruster assisted ship's rudder
- Rudder – Control surface for fluid-dynamic steering in the yaw axis
