= Friedrich Wilhelm Pleuger =

German engineer and entrepreneur

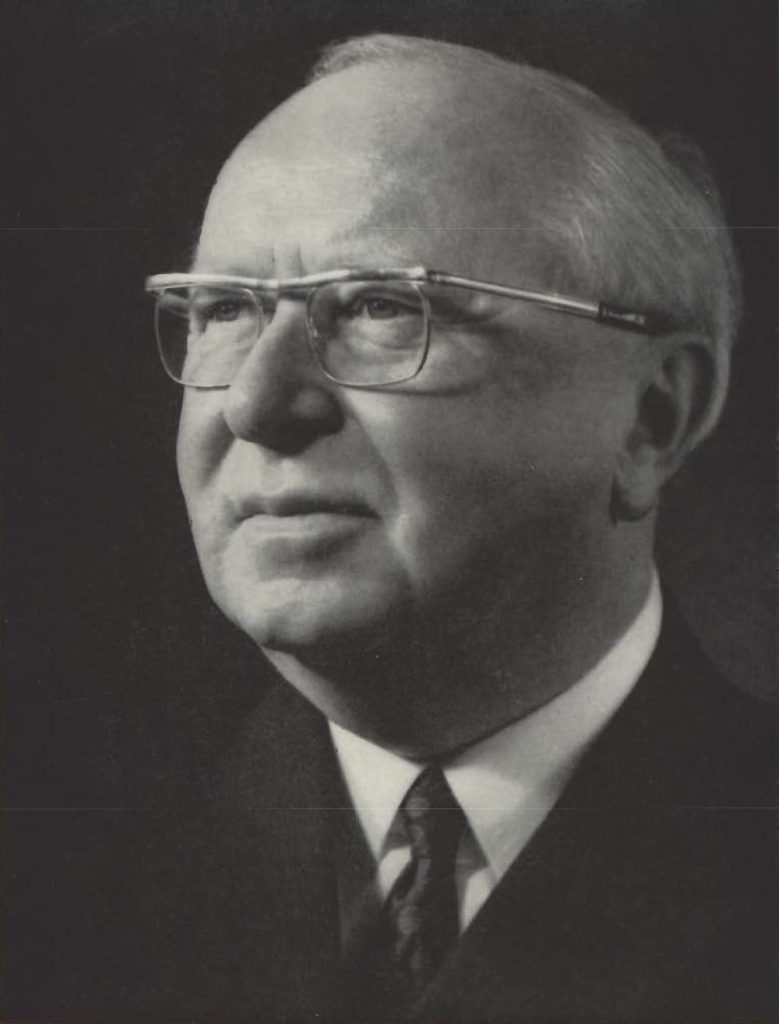
Friedrich Wilhelm Pleuger

Friedrich Wilhelm Pleuger (born 6 April 1899 in Bonn; died 9 October 1972 in Hamburg) was a German engineer and entrepreneur who developed and patented a number of inventions, in particular water-filled electric motors, submersible pumps and ship rudder systems. He was a partner and founder of Pleuger Unterwasserpumpen GmbH in Hamburg (known as Pleuger Industries today), through which he marketed and sold these products. In addition, he was also the consul general of Ghana in Hamburg.

His technical developments have been used in various fields worldwide. For example, in underground railway construction (Berlin, Moscow) and in drainage systems all over the world.

== Personal life ==
Friedrich W. Pleuger was born on 6 April 1899 in Bonn on the Rhine. He visited the city high school there before leaving to fight in the First World War. He returned from the war as a lieutenant and then studied at the Technische Hochschule Berlin and a business school. Pleuger had a wife (Irmgard Pleuger) and a son. After his death in 1972 Petra Lange reported, that she was Pleuger's illegitimate daughter. Irmgard Pleuger did not believe this and accused her of being Pleuger's mistress.

== Company and innovations ==
In 1929 Pleuger began to develop submersible pumps with wet rotor motors in Berlin Unter den Linden. His developments were used during the construction of the underground railway in Berlin. The pumps were used for lowering the groundwater level. Pleuger acquired other pump manufacturing companies, expanding his company further. Special new developments made it possible to pump high-quality, bacteria-free drinking water from deep-seated groundwater layers. These new developments opened the way for expansion into the municipal drinking water supply. Pleuger's company grew rapidly, through major projects such as the construction of the underground railway in Moscow as well as drainage systems in France, Mexico and Argentina. By the outbreak of the Second World War Pleuger employed over 200 people. During the war, the two factories in Berlin and Greiz that had been built up to then were largely destroyed. The remains were expropriated by the GDR after the war.

In October 1945 Pleuger decided to move to Hamburg and set up a small repair workshop in the Altona district. He succeeded in recruiting former Pleuger employees back into his company and therefore their know-how. Soon former Pleuger customers contacted him and asked for repairs or spare parts for their Pleuger pumps. In the early post-war years the company grew rapidly and was able to acquire large orders again. This growth made it possible to build a factory in Hamburg-Wandsbek, which is still the headquarters today. By 1968, the Hamburg factory contained ten production halls, five administrative buildings, a test hall and an open-air test basin, was built on an area of 41,000 m². The number of employees grew from 200 in 1954 to 650 in 1968.

In addition to the production of pumps, Pleuger also intensified the production of the manoeuvring aids "Active Rudders", which were developed according to his idea. He developed these already during the Second World War, but the patent was only registered after the war, as no resources were available in the administration during the war. Pleuger also invented the azimuth thruster.

Its technical innovations helped Pleuger's company expand abroad. This expansion led to Pleuger founding various subsidiaries abroad, including in the USA, Mexico, England and Spain.

After his death, the company continued to expand. It merged several times with other pump manufacturers, becoming part of Dresser Industries in 1987 as Dresser Pleuger GmbH, 1989 Pleuger Worthington and then as IDP in 1992. Acquisition by the Flowserve conglomerate in 2000 saw Pleuger become part of the world’s second largest pump manufacturer. This acquisition affected the company as business was redeployed throughout the group. In 2019 the company was bought from Flowserve by international investment firm Flacks Group and is now independent again in Hamburg. Flacks Group decided to return the company to its roots, renaming the company Pleuger Industries after its founder.

== Consul of Ghana ==
In search of international expansion possibilities, Pleuger discovered the possibility of investing on the African continent, as his pumps could be used there for water production. Pleuger was the first submersible pump manufacturer to establish a manufacturing and service station in the Republic of Ghana, thereby gaining a foothold in the African continent. Later he founded Pleuger of Ghana Ltd. This entrepreneurial achievement was honoured by the government of Ghana in 1968 when Pleuger was appointed Consul General in the Free and Hanseatic City of Hamburg. After death threats were made against Pleuger and the Secretary of the Consulate General, the Consulate was temporarily closed in June 1972. Besides the threats, Pleuger himself stated the political conditions in Ghana and differences of opinion with the Foreign Service as reasons for his resignation.

== Hostage-taking of Irmgard Pleuger ==
Friedrich Pleuger entered into a compensation business with the former ruler of Equatorial Guinea Macias Mguema. In this deal, local agricultural products from Equatorial Guinea were to be "exchanged" for medicines and vehicles from Germany. Specifically, it was "[2000 t] of cocoa from Equatorial Guinea [and] medical instruments, medicines, 6 Mercedes buses, 2 Mercedes Pullmann 600, 1 Mercedes 300 SEL, 1 Mercedes 280 SEL, 18 BMW motorcycles for the bodyguard, 2 Linotype typesetting machines and a vacuum cleaner [from Germany]". After the exchange of goods, the Agricultural Chamber of Equatorial Guinea posed as the seller and increased the price of the cocoa many times over. Since a friendship existed between the Pleuger couple and the family of Mguema, Irmgard Pleuger flew to Santa Isabel on December 9, 1970, to clarify the matter. She was provided with a "letter of protection" from the president, which, however, like her passport, was confiscated after her arrival and she was taken hostage. Since Irmgard Pleuger had heart problems, she was dependent on appropriate medication, which was not available in Santa Isabel. Therefore, Friedrich Pleuger asked the Geneva Red Cross for help, which brought the medication to Santa Isabel. During the entire kidnapping, the lawyer Christian L. Jarck, as Friedrich Pleuger's chief representative, negotiated with the government of Equatorial Guinea. Mguema demanded a seven-digit sum as a ransom. After Friedrich Pleuger had deposited a bank guarantee, Irmgard Pleuger was able to leave the country after delays by the government of Equatorial Guinea and arrived at Hamburg Airport on 17 January 1971. Together with the cost of the cocoa, the total ransom amounted to 6.1 million German Marks.
