= Pleuger =

German manufacturing company

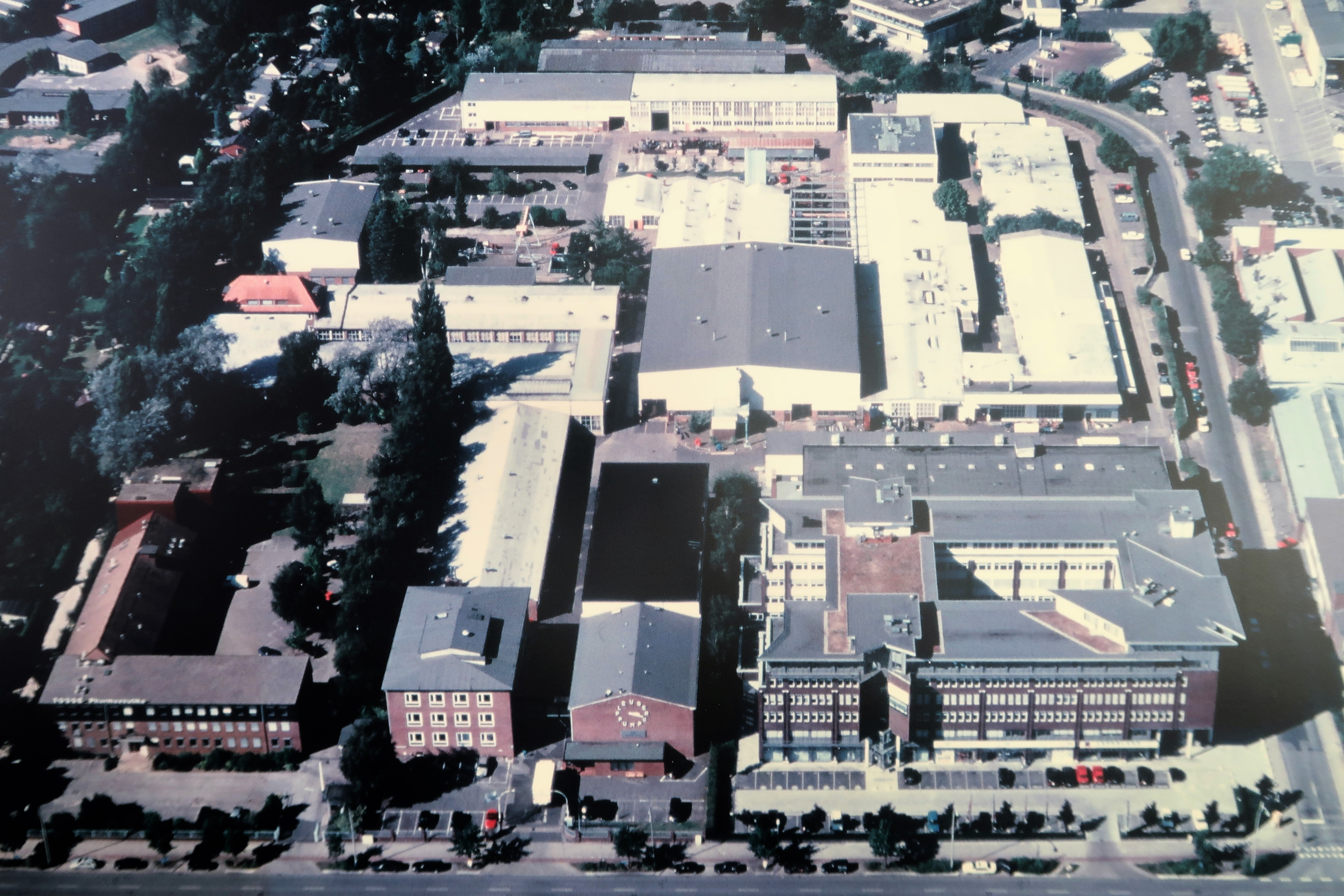
- Pleuger manufacturing plant in Hamburg-Wandsbek.
- Industry: Mechanical Engineering
- Founded: 1929; 97 years ago
- Founder: Friedrich Wilhelm Pleuger
- Headquarters: Friedrich-Ebert-Damm 105 22047, Hamburg, Germany; 53.588300°N +10.090344°E
- Area served: Worldwide
- Key people: Michael Flacks (Chairman); Christian Dreser (CEO)
- Products: Submersible motors and pumps, thrusters, reciprocating pumps and related services for industrial applications
- Number of employees: 300 (2023)
- Parent: Flacks Group
- Website: www.pleugerindustries.com

Pleuger Industries is a German manufacturer of submersible pumps, thrusters, and plunger pumps. It is based in Hamburg, Germany. According to the company itself, the brandnames of Hamburg manufacturers, including "Pleuger", are used as generic terms for water-filled motors with multi-stage pumps. It is also considered as the pioneer of submersible turbine pump motor.

Since being acquired by the investment company, Flacks Group, in 2018, Pleuger is operating as an independent company.

== History ==
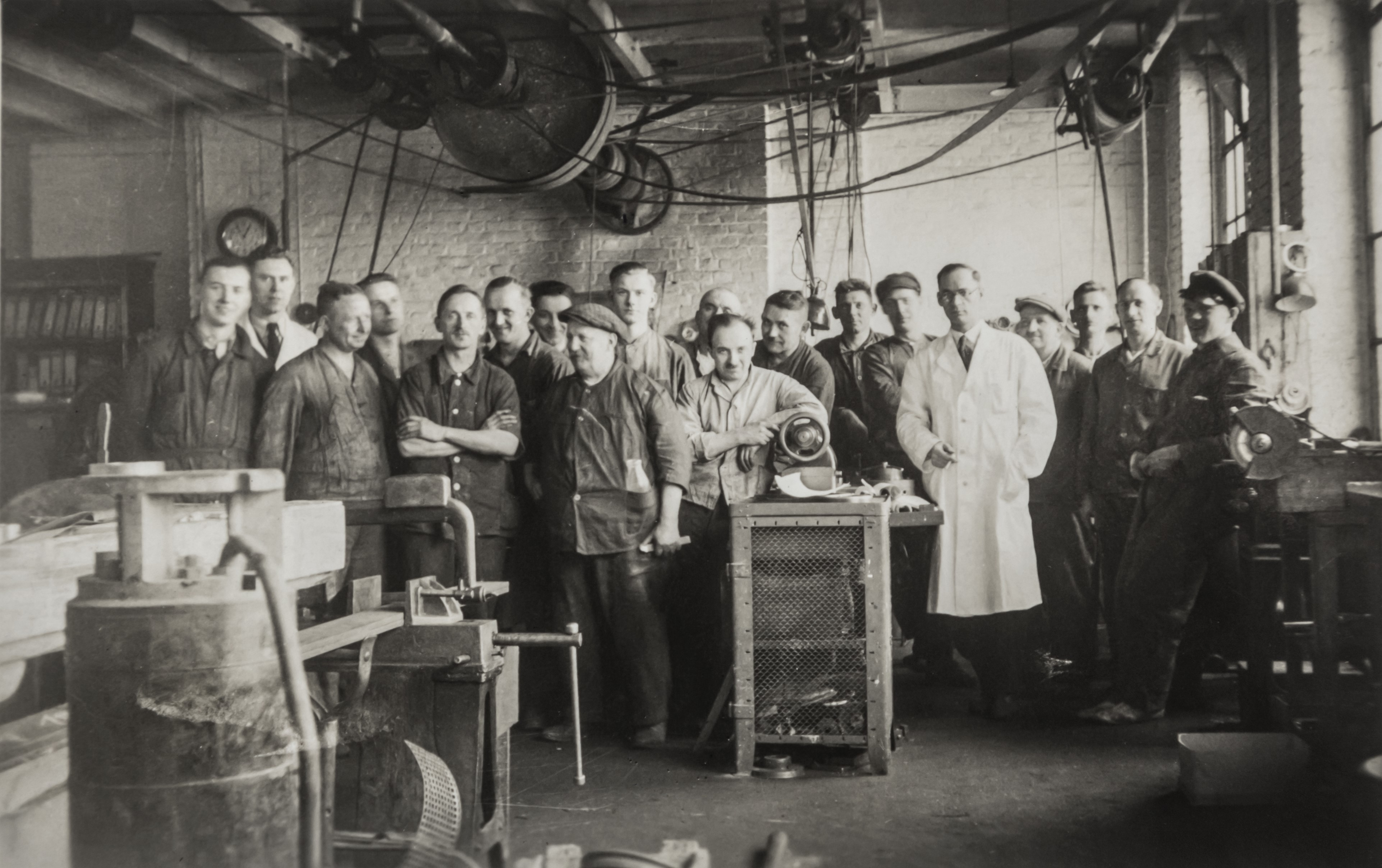
Pleuger first workshop in 1929 in Berlin Kottbusser Ufer

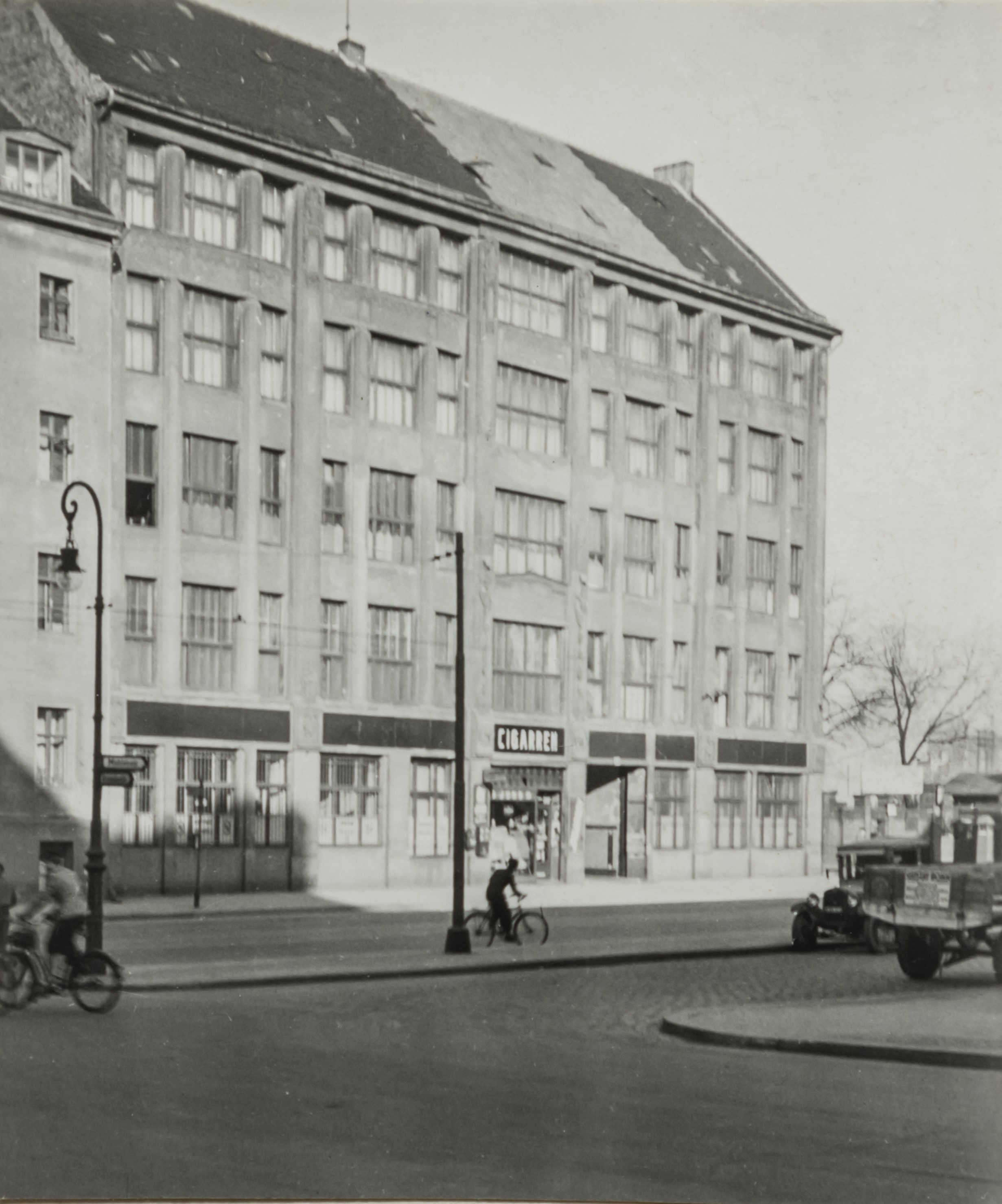
Pleuger Building in 1939 in Berlin Mühlenstr

=== Foundation ===
Pleuger Industries was founded in 1929 by Friedrich Wilhelm Pleuger, when he invented glandless motor as a replacement to the borehole shaft and piston pumps. Since water was used to lubricate and cool the bearings of the wet rotor motor, the patent was regarded particularly ecologically benign and effective at the time. In contrast to oil-filled submersible motors of the time, Pleuger pumps had the critical benefit that they could be employed in sensitive sectors such as drinking water delivery. In the 1930s, these pumps became the universally accepted standard.

In 1930, during the expansion of Berlin subway system, Pleuger installed directly coupled water-filled submersible motors. The pumps helped lower the groundwater for the construction project. In 1945, during the World War II, Pleuger plants in Berlin and Greitz were damaged or destroyed. After the war, Friedrich Wilhelm Pleuger restarted the work in a minor repair workshop in Hamburg-Altona. In 1951, a new plant was established in Wandsbek, Hamburg and subsequently its headquarters were relocated there.

=== Dresser Industries ownership ===
In the 1970s, Pleuger Industries partnered with an American company, TRW, to expand in new regions in addition to development and exchange of new products and technologies. In 1987, Dresser Industries acquired Pleuger from TRW to form Dresser Pleuger GmbH. The acquisition of Pleuger helped Dresser to expand its submersible pumps in drainage, irrigation, and offshore applications.

=== Pleuger Worthington formation ===
In 1989, Pleuger Worthington was formed after a merger between Dresser Pleuger GmbH and Deutsch Worthington. In 1992, it became part of the Ingersoll-Dresser Pump (IDP).

=== Flowserve ownership ===
In 2000, Flowserve acquired Pleuger to form Flowserve Pleuger. In November 2013, Pleuger introduced Pleuger PMM6, a submersible pump made from permanent magnets and was ten percent more efficient than its predecessor, and in February 2016, it launched Pleuger PMM8 submersible electric motor that works with variable frequency drives.

=== Flacks Group ownership ===
In 2018, Flacks Group acquired Pleuger from Flowserve. In 2019, Pleuger established a subsidiary in Moscow, Russia, and expanded its operations while opening a subsidiary in Singapore in 2020. In 2021, the company redeveloped its subsidiary brand, Aldrich. In 2022, Pleuger closed its Russian subsidiary and established its headquarters in Miami. As of May 2026, Christian Dreser is the Group CEO of Pleuger.

== Application ==
Pleuger's products are used internationally in the energy industry, mining, the oil and gas industry, the renewable energy, and the water market sector. Throughout its history, its pumps have been used in various applications around the world, including at the Moutoa Floodway, Alster fountain, Collahuasi mine, and Montpellier.

=== Alster fountain ===
Since the 1980s, Pleuger pumps are installed in the Alsterfontäne, a fountain that has an output of 70 kW and can pump 180,000 liters of water per hour to a height of up to 60 meters. The pumps were first installed in 1982 for free when the foundation was established. For the pump, the permanent magnet technology (PMM) drive has been used, which was installed in 2018. Pleuger also provides annual maintenance in partnership with the Binnenalster Foundation

== See also ==
- Pleuger rudder, a rudder named after Pleuger
