= Schilling rudder =

Low aspect ratio rudder with endplates

A Schilling rudder is a specific type of profiled rudder used on certain boats and ships. The rudder is typically described as 'shaped like a fishtail'.

A stainless steel Schilling rudder, as fitted to a small steam-powered launch

== Concept ==
The Schilling profile is designed to improve the effective lift generated by the rudder and hence improve the maneuverability of the craft, especially at slow speeds. The rudder is effective in both forward and reverse. It has been claimed that a Schilling rudder "combines the highest lateral forces with the best course stability.

=== Use ===
Like all rudders, the main effect of a Schilling rudder is to deflect the flow of water generated by the propeller. Schilling rudders are most commonly used on ships that are difficult to maneuver, particularly large ships such as container ships and oil tankers, slow-moving ships and barges, boat that are long and narrow, or boats with slow-moving propellers.

=== Twin-rudder configuration ===
The Schilling rudder is invariably used for single propeller vessels, which may also employ bow thrusters or even stern thrusters to contribute further to maneuverability. However, since any vessel with twin propellers is inherently more manoevrable than a single-prop vessel, it follows that a Schilling rudder may add little benefit. Some racing sailboats have twin rudders, but this is to allow better steering when heeled. Such yachts would typically have a small central folding propeller, whereby its twin rudders would receive no propwash, so having a pair of Schilling rudders would, again, be suoerfluous.

== Shape ==
The basic shape is a relatively simple ‘fish shape’ if viewed from above (as seen in the figure to the right). Also, a pair of flat plates are typically welded to the top and bottom to prevent or minimise the end-effect on the aerofoil and maintain 'lift'.

Depiction of Schilling profile

A CAD model of a Schilling rudder to be fitted to a canal narrowboat, some compromise to the shape has been made to reduce the likelihood of it catching on underwater obstructions.

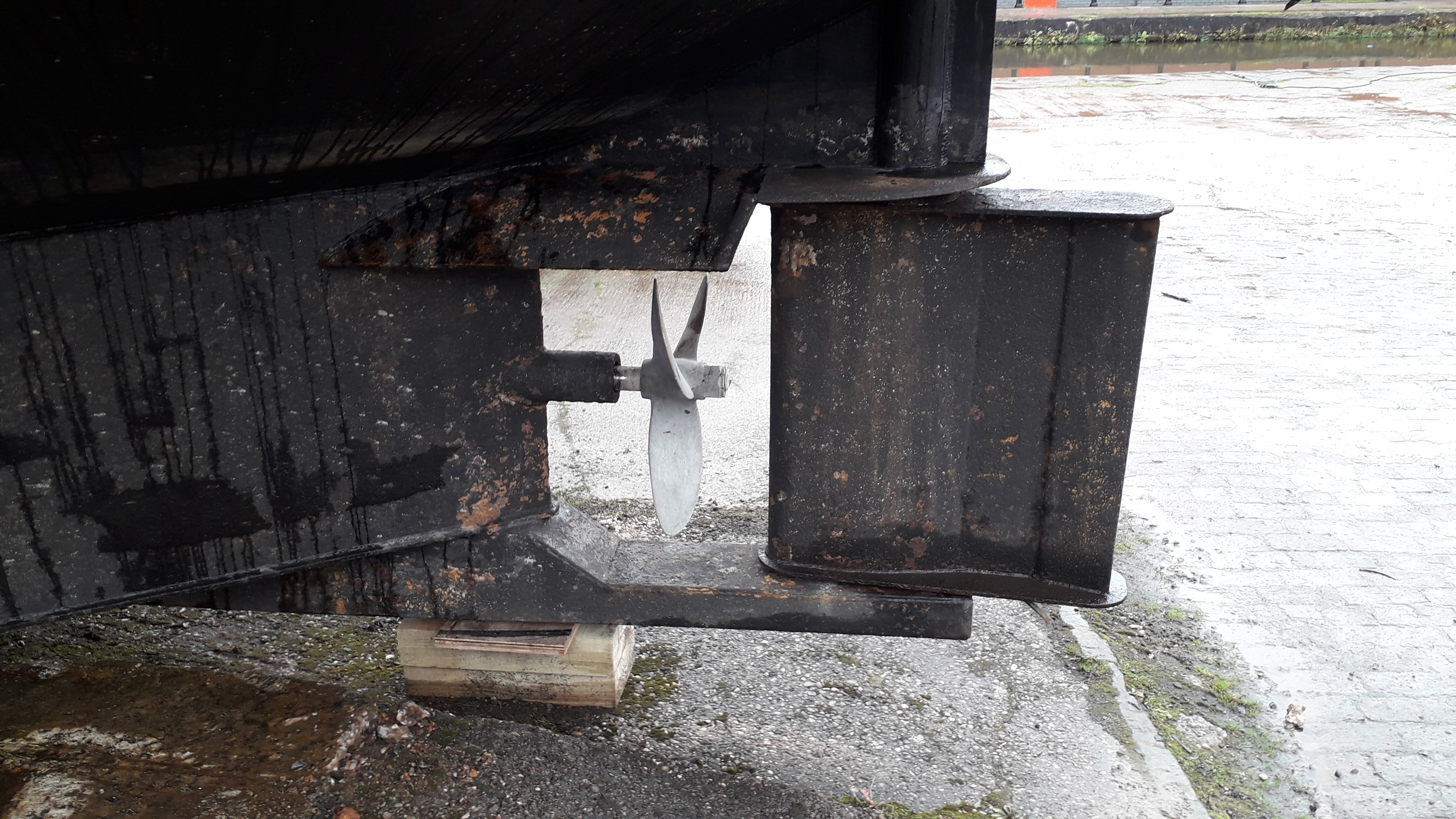
Schilling rudder on a river barge. The pivot point is 36% of the length from the leading edge, both to promote efficiency and to lessen the turning effort. (Note the anti-cavitation plates above the propeller and atop the forepart of the rudder).

The basic principle proportions of a typical Schilling rudder layout are as follows:

- Rounded leading edge
- Maximum width of aerofoil at 20% chord.
- Taper to 60% chord.
- Flat to 80% chord
- Flare to 100%

Or in other words, a bulbous widening for 1/5 of the total length of the rudder blade, with a streamlined narrowing for 2/5 of the length leading to a flat section lasting for around 1/5 of a cord-length, finalizing in a blunt-ended flared trailing edge for the remaining fifth.

The width of the trailing edge should be 33% of the maximum width of the profiles. The width of the end plates to be around twice the maximum width of the rudder.

The height should be at least as tall as the diameter of the propeller, with the chord length being up to 1.2 × propeller diameter. If extreme maneuverability is not required, chord length can be reduced to a minimum of 0.55 × propeller diameter.

Around 40% balance should be provided, aka, rudder in front of the rudder pivot.

The distance from the trailing edge of the propeller to the leading of the rudder should be a minimum of 0.2 × propeller diameter, and the maximum effective angle of operation for a single rudder is 2*70 degrees.

=== Other names ===
Rudders of the same or similar profile are also referred to as the MacLear-Thistle or Mystic rudder.

== Alternatives ==
Alternatives to the Shilling rudder concept include conventional aerofoil shapes, i.e. without the flared end, flap rudders, Kort nozzles and azimuth thrusters.

== See also ==
- Azimuth thruster – Steerable propulsion pod under a watercraft
- Ducted propeller – Marine propeller with a non-rotating nozzle
- Kitchen rudder – Type of directional propulsion system for vessels
- Flap rudder – Marine rudder with a trailing edge flap
- Pleuger rudder – Thruster assisted ship's rudder
