= Kelly-Moore Paints =

American paint manufacturing company

- Type: Private
- Industry: Paint and coatings manufacturing Retail
- Founded: 1946; 80 years ago
- Founders: William Kelly; William Moore
- Defunct: January 12, 2024; 2 years ago
- Fate: Closed
- Headquarters: Irving, Texas, U.S.
- Key people: Charles Gassenheimer (CEO); Michael Flacks (Chairman of the Board)
- Products: AcryPlex; DuraPoxy; Epic; Envy; Kel-Bond; Kel-Pro
- Revenue: ▲US$400 million (2022)
- Number of employees: 1200 (2022)
- Parent: Flacks Group
- Website: kellymoore.com

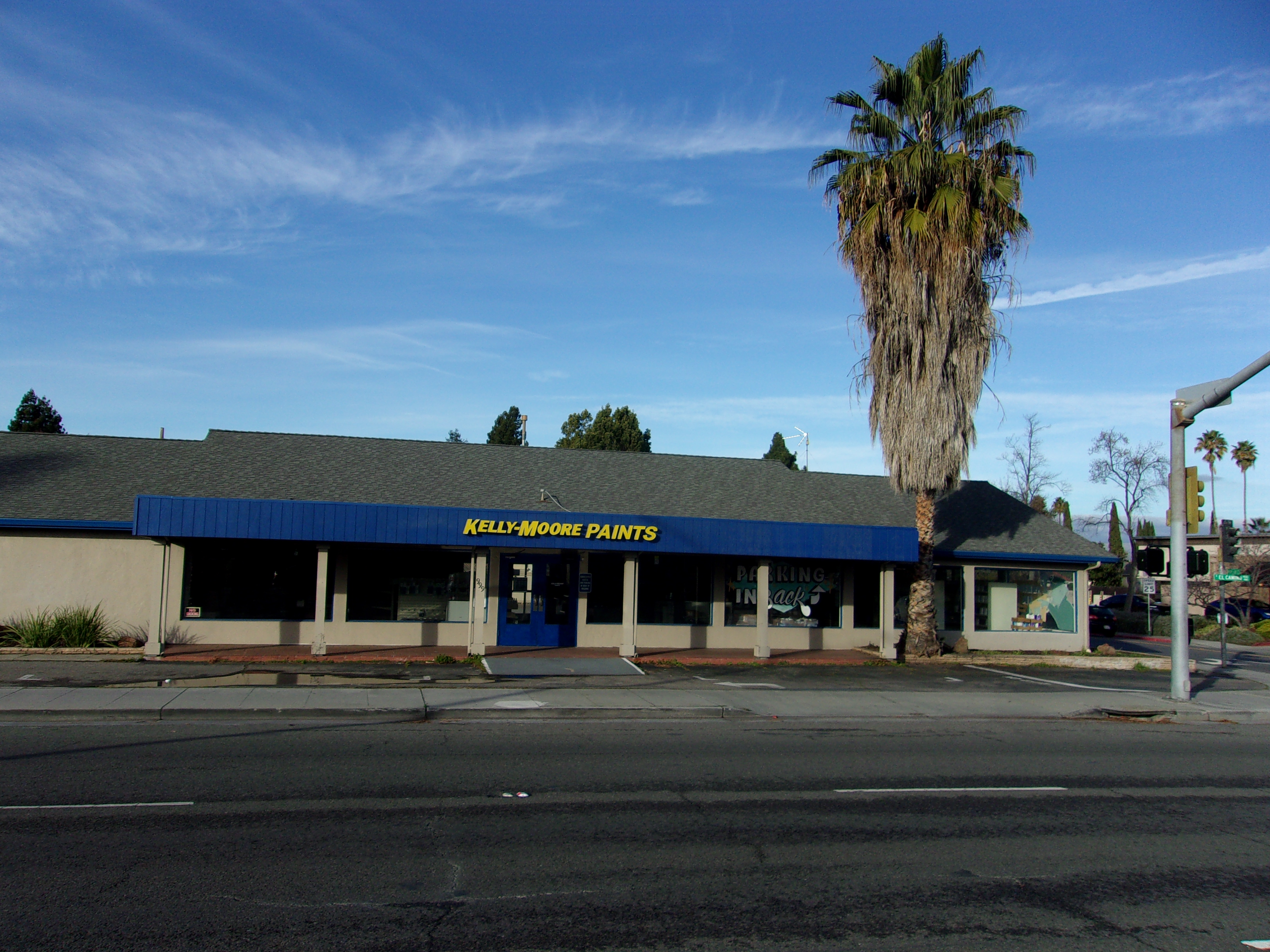
Kelly-Moore Paints store in Sunnyvale, California

Kelly-Moore Paints was an American paint manufacturing company. Founded in 1946 by William Kelly and William Moore in San Carlos, California, it moved its headquarters from there to Irving, Texas, in 2023. Its manufacturing plant was located in Hurst, Texas.

At its height, the company was one of America’s largest independent paint companies. As of October 2022, when it was acquired by investment firm Flacks Group, Kelly-Moore had 157 stores located in California, Texas, Oklahoma, and Nevada.

In January 2024, the company announced that it would close all of its stores and cease operating, other than to fill existing orders from its distribution facility.

== History ==
=== 1946–1952: Founding ===
Kelly-Moore Paints was founded in 1946 by William Kelly and William Moore, former Glidden employees.

=== 1952–1984: Acquisition by William Moore and expansion ===
Moore bought out Kelly in 1952, and for the next thirty years he was actively involved in every facet of the business. He played an essential role in the evolution of production methods and the planning and designing of company-owned stores.

In 1974, retail sales made up almost 25 percent of the total revenue. As a result of market shifts, that percentage would increase to 37 percent within a decade. There was a rise in the number of homeowners who wanted to paint their own homes. Kelly-Moore maintained annual growth of 13 percent over the past decade.

In 1984, Kelly-Moore had a revenue of $136 million and a profit of almost $11 million, when Moore announced retirement.

=== 1984–1998: New management ===
Joseph P. Cristiano took over as CEO of Kelly-Moore in January 1985, six months after William Moore retired. He spent those months shadowing sales representatives to learn the ropes.

In 1994, Kelly-Moore Paints expanded its presence in Alaska and Washington by acquiring Preservative Paint Co. of Seattle. The purchase created a wholly owned subsidiary of Kelly-Moore Paints with two new retail locations in Alaska and fifteen new retail locations in Washington.

In 1995, Kelly-Moore acquired K-M Universal, expanding its presence in the Southwest by adding a factory in Tempe, Arizona, and a number of retail outlets in the state of Arizona and the state of California. A year later, Kelly-Moore expanded its new subsidiary by absorbing another acquisition, the paint division of Island Equipment Co., situated in Guam.

=== 1998–2022: ESOP ===
In 1998, Moore and his wife set up an ESOP, which provided both a retirement and stock ownership plan for eligible employees.

In 1999, Kelly-Moore partnered with M.A. Bruder & Sons, a Pennsylvania-based company with a business model and customer base comparable to its own, in an effort to strengthen both firms' positions in the marketplace. They were both able to serve national accounts since their regions did not overlap; M.A. Bruder handled projects on the East Coast, while Kelly-Moore handled those on the West Coast. As a result of the collaboration, both businesses were included beside each other in the American Institute of Architects' MasterSpec Finishes directory, which is used by some 5,500 architectural and construction firms.

In 2000, Diamond Vogel Paints and later Dunn-Edwards joined their alliance, which was known as Paints America. In the same year, Kelly-Moore Paints acquired Ponderosa Paint Manufacturing.

In January 2003, Herb R. Giffins replaced Cristiano as the new president and CEO of Kelly-Moore Paints.

In 2011, the company closed all of its stores in Oregon; it subsequently closed all stores in the state of Washington.

The company relocated its manufacturing from the San Francisco Bay Area to Hurst, Texas, in 2017. In April 2022, it received the governor's Texas Environmental Excellence Award in the Pollution Prevention category.

=== 2022–2023: Acquisition by Flacks Group ===
In September 2022, Kelly Moore Paints was acquired by Flacks Group, a Miami-based investment firm. Flacks Group bought the paint company's retailing, distributing and manufacturing units. After the acquisition, Charles Gassenheimer, managing partner of the Flacks Group, became the CEO of Kelly-Moore Paints. The company headquarters moved to Irving, Texas in 2023.

=== 2024: Closure ===
In January 2024, the company announced that it would close all of its stores and cease operating, other than to fill existing orders from its distribution facility. In a statement, the CEO said "... we simply couldn’t overcome the massive legal and financial burdens that have been weighing on the Company for many years" - the company said that “ever-continuing case filings” had cost Kelly-Moore $600 million in settlements, asbestos being phased out by 1981.

In May 2024, Latex Paint S.A. de C.V. acquired the intellectual property assets of Kelly-Moore Paints. This enables Latex Paint, though its licensee, Sayer Lack Mexicana, to expand its international offerings of paints and coating products.
