= Oil pump =

Oil pump may refer to:

- Hydraulic pump, which pressurizes hydraulic fluid in a hydraulic system
- Oil pump (internal combustion engine), a part of the lubrication system that pressurizes motor oil for distribution around the engine
- Pumpjack, often used to pump oil out of wells
- Submersible pump, often used to pump oil out of wells
- Vacuum pump, of a design which uses an oil seal
