= Kitchen rudder =

Type of directional propulsion system for vessels

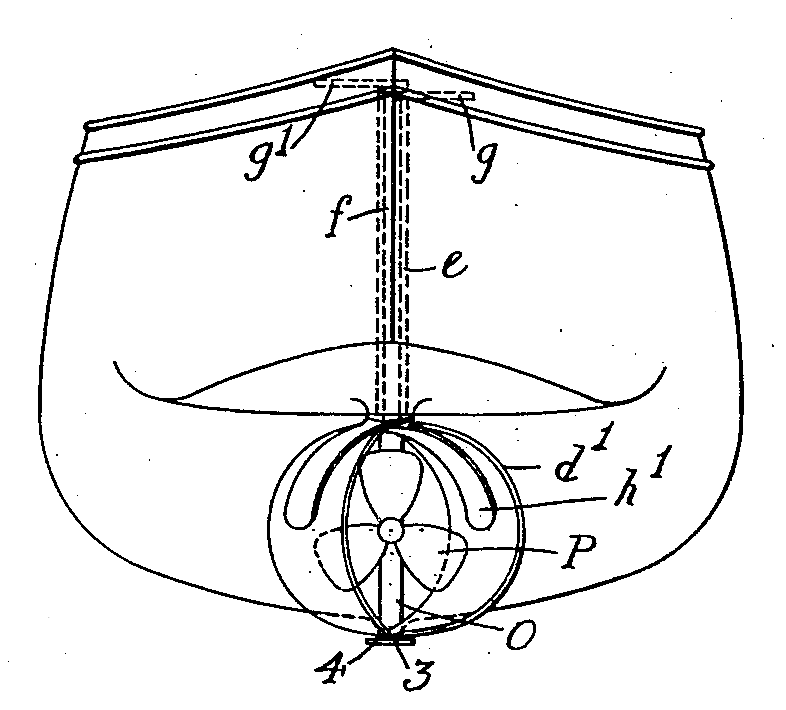
Kitchen Rudder. Image from the 1916 U.S. patent.

Enhanced design to the Kitchen Rudder. Image from the 1990 U.S. patent.

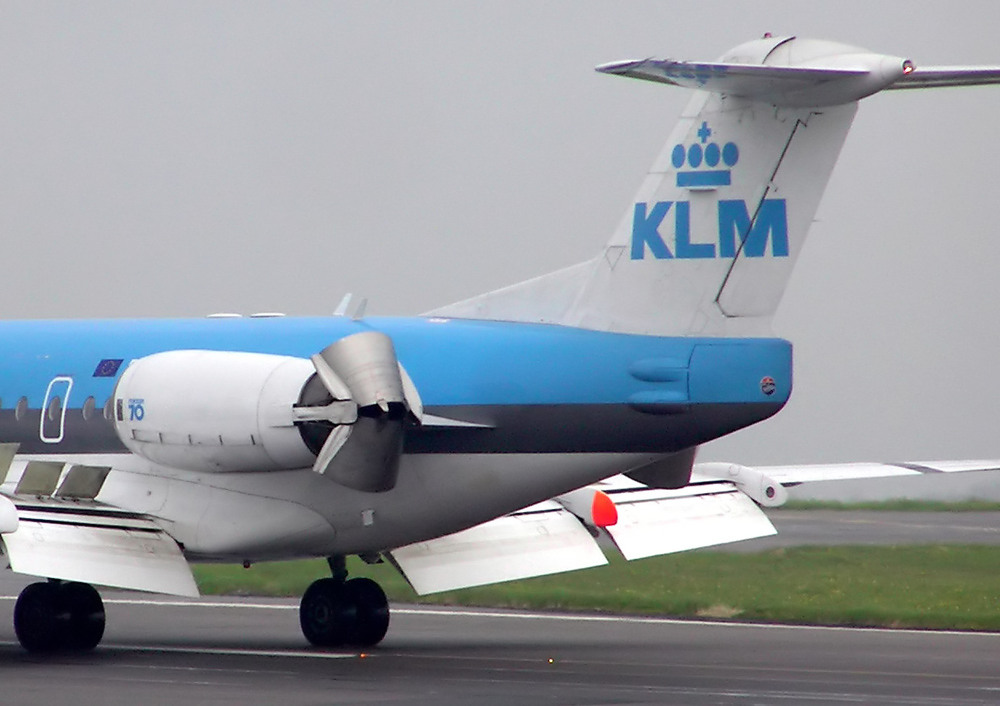
KLM Fokker 70 with reverse thrust applied. The two surfaces behind the engine can be seen in the deployed position, diverting the engine exhaust gases (hence thrust) forward. This is similar to the Kitchen rudder in "Full astern" position

The Kitchen rudder is the familiar name for "Kitchen's Patent Reversing Rudders", a combination rudder and directional propulsion delivery system for relatively slow speed displacement boats which was invented in the early 20th century by John G. A. Kitchen of Lancashire, England. It turns the rudder into a directional thruster, and allows the engine to maintain constant revolutions and direction of drive shaft rotation while altering thrust by use of a control which directs thrust forward or aft. Only the rudder pivots; the propeller itself is on a fixed shaft and does not.

"Kitchener gear" or "Kitchener rudder" have been common misnomers for the Kitchen rudder.

It is held under British Provisional Patent No. 3249/1914 and US Patent No. 1186210 (1916) and has been improved with the design in US Patent 4895093 (1990).

== Description ==
The rudder consists of a pair of slightly conical (usually but not always - designs vary), semi-cones mounted on a pivot either side of the propeller with the long axis of the cone running fore and aft when the helm is midships. They are pivoted about a vertical axis such that the cone may close off the propeller thrust aft of the propeller, directing the thrust forwards and thus creating motion astern.

In addition to the "jaws" of the cone being controlled the direction of thrust is also controlled by rudder direction. In this way, it is unlike the azimuth thrusters used on many medium and large vessels, or the outboard motors or stern drives used by some small boats, since these all use the directed thrust to avoid the need of a rudder altogether.

Modern equivalent include certain types of pump jets or Kort nozzle.

While not strictly Kitchen rudder technology, the "bucket" on some aircraft jet engines is an aeronautical derivative of the device. When the deflectors are deployed, directing thrust forwards, they are equivalent to the Kitchen rudder in the "full astern" position.

== Operation ==
The operation of the Kitchen rudder is performed with the propeller engaged, even when the boat is stationary. The rudder is controlled by a small wheel on the tiller.

=== Neutral ===
The engine is brought up to speed with the drive to the propeller engaged and with the Kitchen rudder in the "neutral" position. This is a position where an equal quantity of thrust is aimed forward and aft. Each vessel will have a unique "neutral" position.

=== Moving ahead ===
The Kitchen gear is opened up to direct an increasing proportion of thrust aft. As the balance changes the vessel will move ahead.

=== Moving astern ===
The Kitchen gear is closed to direct an increasing proportion of thrust forward. As the balance changes the vessel will move astern.

== See also ==
- Azipod – Electric drive azimuth thruster
- Ducted propeller – Marine propeller with a non-rotating nozzle
- Pleuger rudder – Thruster assisted ship's rudder
- Schilling rudder – Low aspect ratio rudder with endplates
- Sterndrive – Type of boat engine
