= Ludwig Kort =

Ludwig Kort (1888–1958) was a German fluid dynamicist known for developing the ducted propeller, or Kort nozzle. In an attempt to reduce canal erosion, Kort discovered that directing the wake of a propeller through a short, stationary nozzle also increased thrust. He submitted a U.S. patent for this technique, which was awarded in 1936. His research showed that the performance of ducted propellers heavily depended on the cross-section and thickness of the duct.
