= MAB Paints =

M.A.B. Paints
- Company type: Public
- Industry: Paint/Coatings
- Founded: 1899
- Headquarters: Broomall, PA, U.S.
- Products: Paint; Industrial coating Painting equipment
- Revenue: $146,000,000
- Owner: Sherwin-Williams
- Number of employees: 730 (2006)
- Website: www.mabpaints.com

M.A.B. Paints (officially M.A. Bruder & Sons Inc.) was a regional manufacturer of architectural, commercial and industrial coatings for the professional and do-it-yourself markets. Founded in 1899 in South Philadelphia by Michael A. Bruder, M.A.B. Paints grew to over 230 stores in 17 states.

== History ==
From 1967, M.A.B. was run by Thomas A. Bruder, and was privately held until it was purchased by Sherwin-Williams in 2007. M.A.B. Paints was well known throughout the Philadelphia metropolitan area because of their Make America Beautiful campaign and their sponsorship of local professional and amateur sports teams and charities, including the 2007 United States Club Lacrosse Association (USCLA) Champions, Philadelphia "M.A.B. Paints" Lacrosse Club.

The company's service motto was "On Time As Promised, Or We Pay," which was displayed in M.A.B. stores and facilities, and on M.A.B. business cards.
