= Alster fountain =

Fountain in Hamburg, Germany

Alster fountain is a landmark located in Hamburg, Germany.

== History ==
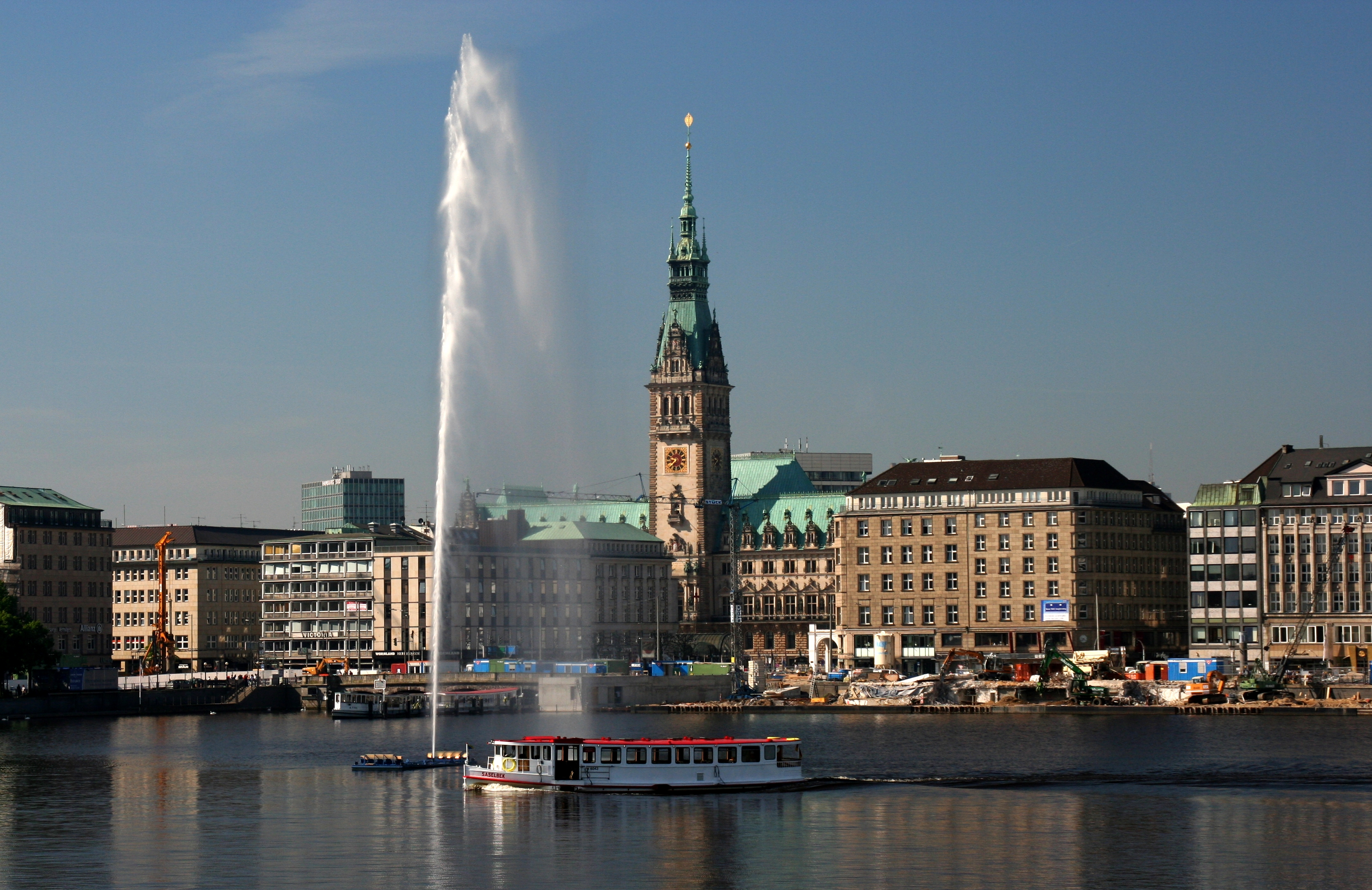
Alster fountain in 2005

Alster fountain, a fountain in Hamburg, was conceived by Carlheinz Hollmann based on Jet d'Eau, a fountain in Geneva, Switzerland. It was opened on 18 April 1987.

It operates daily from March to November of a calendar year. The fountain can go up to height of 60 meters and transports around 180,000 liters of water per hour.

In 2022, it was closed in September due to 2021–2022 global energy crisis.
