= Ducted propeller =

Marine propeller with a non-rotating nozzle

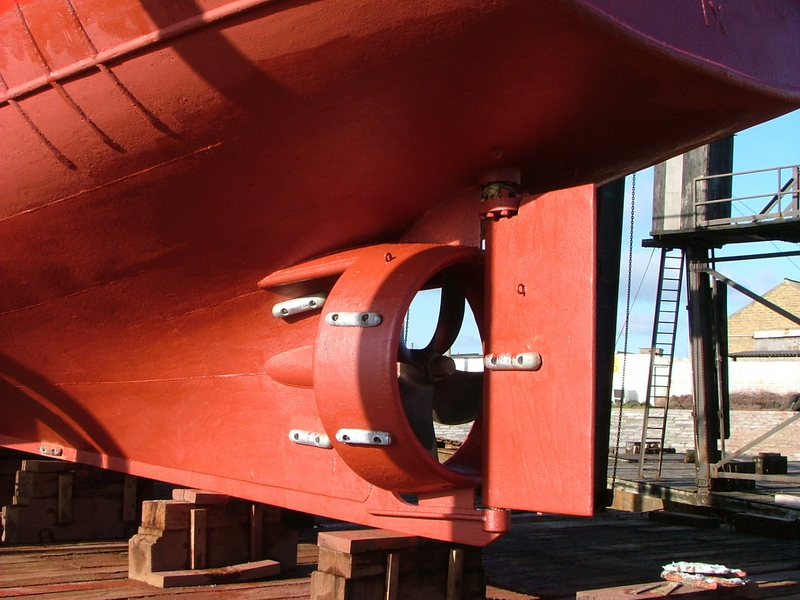
Kort nozzle

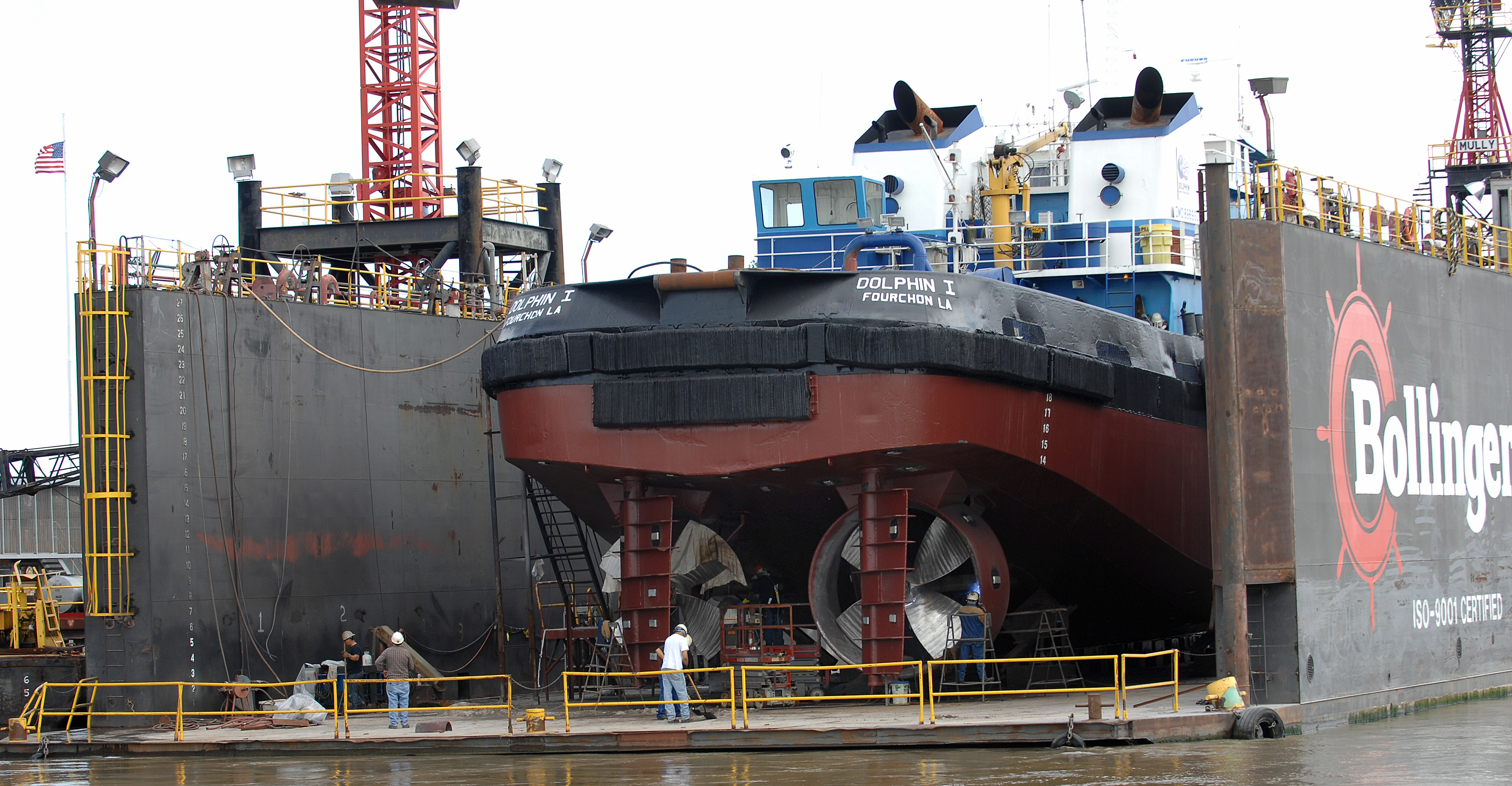
The towboat Dolphin I in a floating drydock on the Mississippi River, in Algiers, Louisiana

A ducted propeller, also known as a Kort nozzle, is a marine propeller shrouded with a non-rotating nozzle. It is used to improve the efficiency of the propeller and is especially used on heavily loaded propellers or propellers with limited diameter. It was developed first by Luigi Stipa (1931) and later by Ludwig Kort (1934). The cross-section of the shroud has the form of a foil, and the shroud can offer hydrodynamic advantages over bare propellers, under certain conditions.

Advantages are increased efficiency at lower speeds (<10 knots), better course stability and less vulnerability to debris. Downsides are reduced efficiency at higher speeds (>10 knots), course stability when sailing astern, and increased cavitation. Ducted propellers are also used to replace rudders.

== History ==
Luigi Stipa in 1931 and later Ludwig Kort (1934) demonstrated that an increase in propulsive efficiency could be achieved by surrounding the propeller with a foil-shaped shroud in the case of heavily loaded propellers. A "Kort Nozzle" is referred to as an accelerating nozzle and is generally a MARIN 19A profile or a MARIN 37 profile.

== Advantages and disadvantages ==
Kort nozzles or ducted propellers can be significantly more efficient than unducted propellers at low speeds, producing greater thrust in a smaller package. Tugboats and fishing trawlers are the most common application for Kort nozzles as highly loaded propellers on slow-moving vessels benefit the most. Nozzles have the additional benefits of reducing paddlewheel-effect (e.g. the tendency of a right-hand propeller to back to the left) and reduce bottom suction while operating in shallow water.

The additional shrouding adds drag, however, and Kort nozzles lose their advantage over propellers at about ten knots (18.5 km/h).

Kort nozzles may be fixed, with directional control coming from a rudder set in the water flow, or pivoting, where their flow controls the vessel's steering.

Shrouding of this type is also beneficial to navigation in ice fields since it protects the propeller tips to some extent. However, ice or any other floating object can become jammed between propeller and nozzle, locking up the propeller. Fouled propellers in Kort nozzles are much more difficult to clear than an "open" propeller.

A research paper by Bexton et al. (2012) concluded that ducted propellers were the likely cause of fatal injuries of seals in the northeastern Atlantic. The authors hypothesized that the seals were drawn through the nozzle and past the rotating propeller blades, incurring curvilinear lacerations to skin and muscle tissue. This type of injury has come to be known as a "corkscrew" injury. The authors also comment that other animals, including harbour porpoises, have been seen to exhibit similar injuries.

== Types ==
There are two types of ducts; accelerating and decelerating. With accelerating ducts, the duct profile is airfoil-like curved towards the inner side, which increases the inflow velocity and efficiency of the propeller. This effect works at lower speeds and is compensated increasingly at higher speeds by the added drag of the duct, which tends to decrease the efficiency of the propulsion. The accelerating type is used on heavily loaded propellers or propellers with limited diameter. As Ludwig Kort performed extensive research on it, this type is also called a "Kort nozzle".

With the second type, the straight surface of the duct profile on the inside and the bent one on the outside, the inflow velocity is reduced, whereby pressure is increased, reducing cavitation. This is called a pump-jet, especially in combination with fixed blades or variable stators.

NACA 4415

MARIN has done extensive research on ducted propellers. Many of the used profiles are based on the NACA airfoils of which the NACA 4415 has very good characteristics. Most commonly used are nozzle 19A and 37 of the MARIN series. These have a rounded trailing edge to ease fabrication and increase efficiency sailing astern. Initially, the propellers of the Wageningen B-series were used, later the Kaplan-type with a wider blade tip.

== Physics ==
Circulation around accelerating (left) and decelerating (right) nozzle (flow from right to left)
dT = Thrust dL = Lift	p_{u}: Negative pressure p_{o}: Positive pressure

In a Kort nozzle, the inflow velocity is increased, reducing pressure. This lowers thrust and torque of the propeller. At the same time, a circulation occurs, resulting in an inward aimed force, that has a forward component. The duct therefore has a positive thrust. This is normally larger than the thrust reduction of the propeller. The small clearance between the propeller and duct reduces tip vortex, increasing efficiency.

As drag increases with increasing speed, eventually this will become larger than the added thrust. Vessels that normally operate above this speed are therefore normally not fitted with ducts. When towing, tugboats sail with low speed and heavily loaded propellers, and are often fitted with ducts. Bollard pull can increase up to 30% with ducts.

With decelerating ducts, the circulation opposite of the Kort nozzle, resulting in a negative thrust of the duct. This type is used for high speed vessels with increased exposure to cavitation and vessels that want to reduce noise levels, such as warships.

== See also ==
- Azipod – Electric drive azimuth thruster
- Axial fan design – Fan that induces gas flow mostly parallel to the shaft
- Kitchen rudder – Type of directional propulsion system for vessels
- Pleuger rudder – Thruster assisted ship's rudder

== Bibliography ==
- Carlton, J. (2007): Marine Propellers and Propulsion, Butterworth-Heinemann
- Ghose, J.P., Gokarn R.P. (2004): Basic Ship Propulsion, Allied Publishers
- Oosterveld, M.W.C. (1970): Wake Adapted Ducted Propellers, Nederlands Schip Model Basin, Wageningen
