= Target-type thrust reversal =

Aircraft deceleration method when landing

Video of a target-type thrust reverser in operation

Target-type thrust reversal (also called bucket thrust reversal or clamshell thrust reversal) is a deceleration method when an aircraft lands. Like other types of thrust reversals, it temporarily diverts the engine exhaust (thrust) forward to provide deceleration. This type of thrust-reverser is suitable for engines of 3,000 lbf (13 kN) or greater thrust.

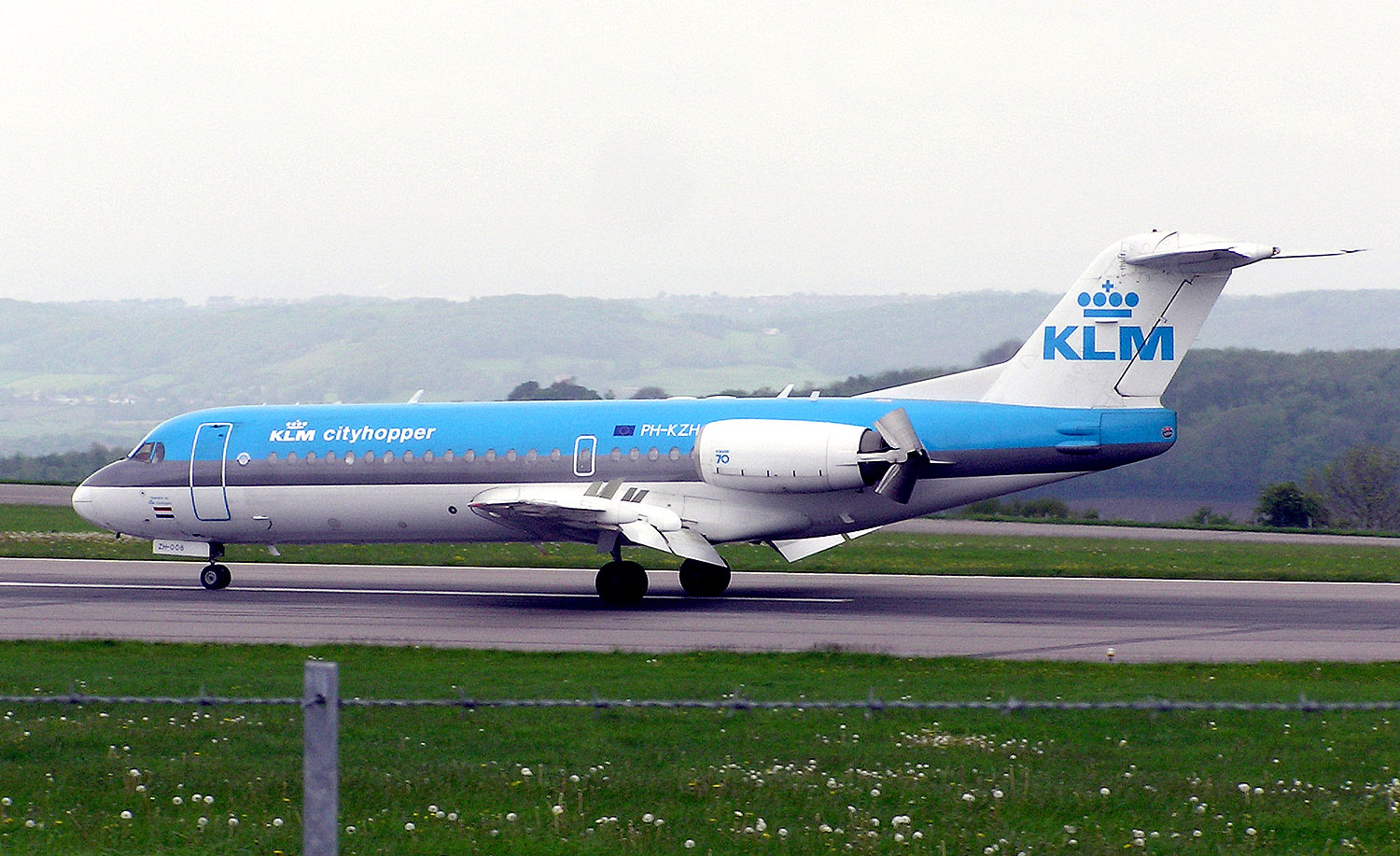
A target-type thrust reverser on a Fokker 70

== History ==
Target-type thrust reversal, particularly this design, was invented in 1968. This invention is stated to be an improvement to previous design. As early as 1963, an invention called "two part thrust reversal" appeared with a similar deflector door design. However, in two part thrust reverser, the mechanism for door deployment and location of deflector doors are significantly different from those of target-type thrust reverser. The inventors (one also as inventor of target-type) states that the design can increase the reverse thrust to 50% of the original thrust. In an earlier development in 1954 called "locks for jet thrust reversers", the design for thrust reversal also contains a flap device to help decelerate and the main purpose of the thrust reverser was to block airflow rather than provide reverse thrust. Dated back to 1945, the first invented thrust reversal device intended to "provide a deflecting device", which can be identified as the first concept for target-type thrust reverser.

== Mechanism ==
The part that provides reverse thrust for thrust reversal is the deflector doors ("bucket") with aerodynamic contour on both inner and outer surface at the tailpipe of a jet engine. The doors are in a deployed location when thrust reversal takes effect and at stowed location when otherwise. When deployed, the doors block the airflow in the end of the engine. In this case airflow passes through the inner surface and travels frontward to provide force opposite to the heading of the aircraft. When stowed, the doors seamlessly connect to the rest parts of the engine to provide a streamlined outer surface.

A pair of beams are located in the left and right of the engines with a sled in each of them. The two doors are connected to both sleds by two rods each. A hydraulic actuator connected to each sled is placed in each beam. The actuator extends to deploy the thrust reversal and retracts to stow the thrust reversal in a way that the rods push the doors to rotate about a point at the end of the tailpipe. The actuator may be connected hydraulically, mechanically or electrically to the control system of the aircraft.

In operation, thrust reversers on all engines typically work together, although they can be activated separately by pilots or aircraft operators.

=== In-flight deployment ===
In most occasions, thrust reversers are deployed after the aircraft touches down. However, some engines with target-type thrust reversers allow in-flight deployment, which means the thrust reversers being deployed when the aircraft is still in air. A considerable proportion of Russia-made aircraft like the Tupolev Tu-154 and Ilyushin Il-62 (unlike the VC-10 which has a Clamshell type reverse thrust) have this feature. Their thrust reversers can be deployed when the landing gears are still a few meters from the ground. The Douglas DC-8, on the other hand, is qualified to use thrust reversal anytime in flight for speed adjustment.

== Application ==
Target-type thrust reversal is commonly applied to low bypass turbofan engines or turbojet engines. In this kind of engine with low bypass ratio, the core part of the engine produces a significantly larger part of the thrust. Therefore, the airflow from the core part must be blocked in order to produce sufficient reverse thrust.

- Boeing 737 Original (100 & 200 & 200 Adv)
- McDonnell Douglas MD-80
- McDonnell Douglas MD-90
- Boeing 717 (McDonnell Douglas MD-95)
- Panavia Tornado
- Ilyushin Il-62
- Tupolev Tu-154
- Cessna Citation

== Variations ==
There are two major variations for this type of thrust reversal.

=== Screw jack mechanism ===
This design changes the hydraulic actuator to a mechanic actuator, specifically, screw jacks operated by motors. The inventors state that this design can reduce the weight of the engine and the maintenance cost since the system is more simplified.

=== Pivot fairing thrust reverser ===
This design makes modification on the aerodynamic performance when the thrust reverser is at stowed location. It optimizes the shape of outlet nozzle from fishmouth shape to round shape. It also compresses the deployment system to reduce weight and complexity. In particular, this design moves the deflector doors from very end of the engine to a front position where it has no contact with the aerodynamic design of the outlet nozzle.

== Accidents ==
- October 31, 1996 – TAM Transportes Aéreos Regionais Flight 402, a Fokker 100, crashed seconds after taking off from São Paulo–Congonhas Airport in São Paulo, Brazil. All 89 passengers and six crew members died along with several people on the ground. The investigation showed that the accident was caused by an uncommanded in-flight deployment of the thrust reverser on one engine; a deficient system design that did not take such a situation into account; and shortcomings in pilot training procedures.
