= Rudder =

Control surface for fluid-dynamic steering in the yaw axis

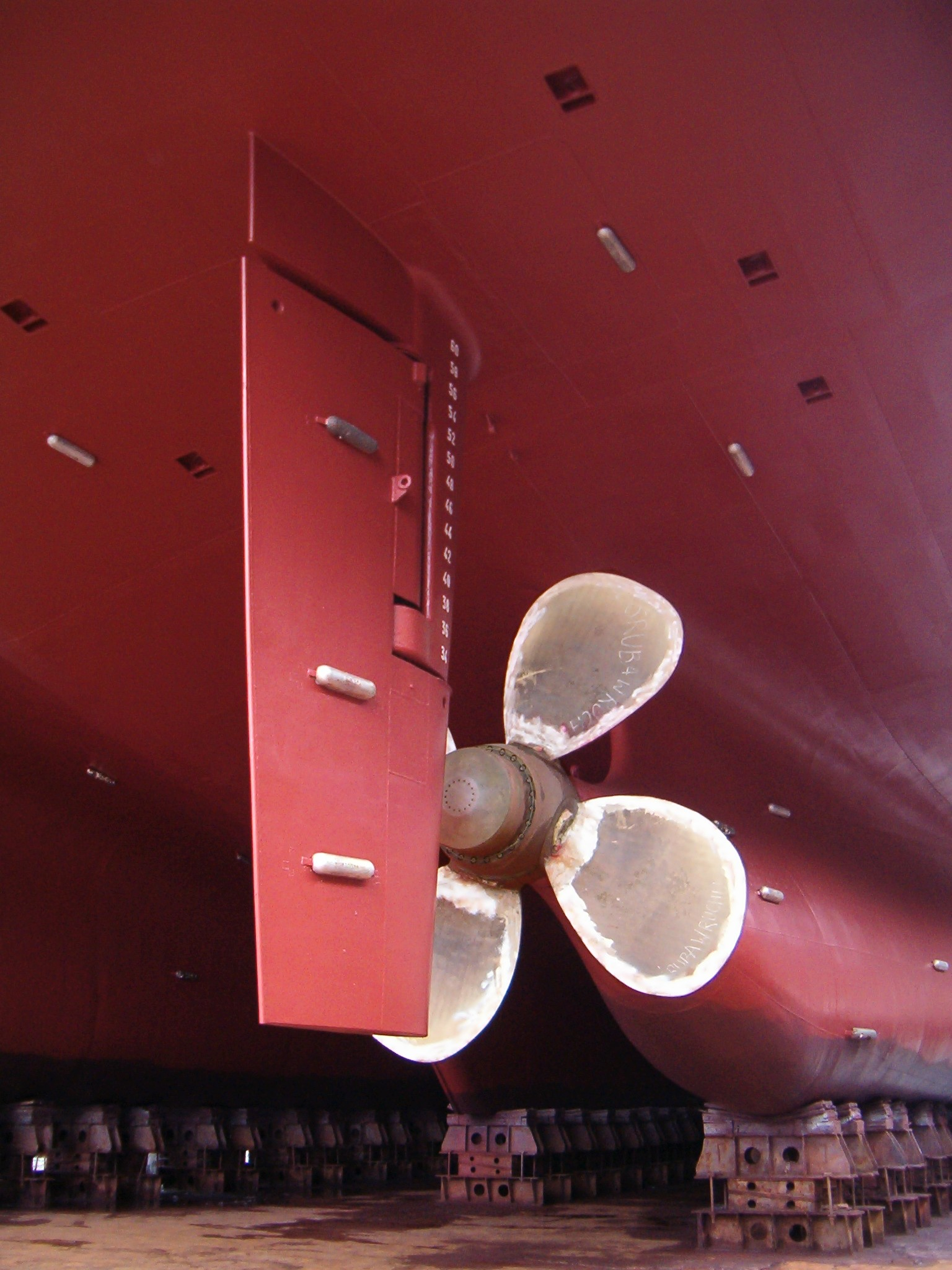
Modern ship rudder (the tall red rectangle behind the propeller)

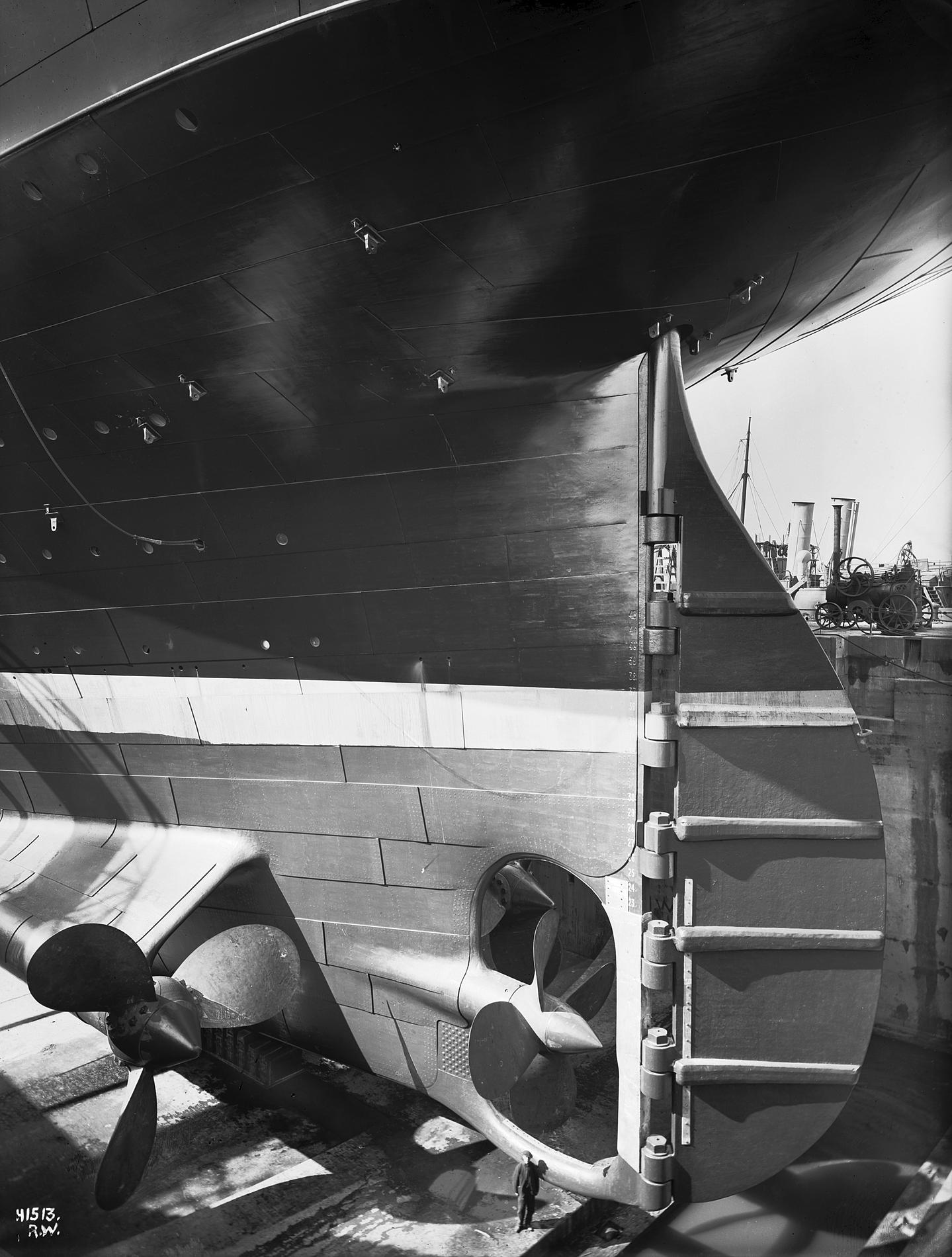
RMS Olympic's rudder turned

A rudder is a primary control surface used to steer a ship, boat, submarine, hovercraft, airship, or other vehicle that moves through a fluid medium (usually water or air). On an airplane, the rudder is used primarily to counter adverse yaw and p-factor and is not the primary control used to turn the airplane. A rudder operates by redirecting the fluid past the hull or fuselage, thus imparting a turning or yawing motion to the craft. In basic form, a rudder is a flat plane or sheet of material attached with hinges to the craft's stern, tail, or afterend. Often rudders are shaped to minimize hydrodynamic or aerodynamic drag. On simple watercraft, a tiller—essentially, a stick or pole acting as a lever arm—may be attached to the top of the rudder to allow it to be turned by a helmsman. In larger vessels, cables, pushrods, or hydraulics may link rudders to steering wheels. In typical aircraft, the rudder is operated by pedals via mechanical linkages or hydraulics.

== History of the rudder ==
Generally, a rudder is "part of the steering apparatus of a boat or ship that is fastened outside the hull, " denoting all types of oars, paddles, and rudders. More specifically, the steering gear of ancient vessels can be classified into side-rudders and stern-mounted rudders, depending on their location on the ship. A third term, steering oar, can denote both types. In a Mediterranean context, side-rudders are more specifically called quarter-rudders as the later term designates more exactly where the rudder was mounted. Stern-mounted rudders are uniformly suspended at the back of the ship in a central position.

Although some (Note: Lawrence Mott in his comprehensive treatment of the history of the rudder, Timothy Runyan, the Encyclopædia Britannica, and The Concise Oxford Dictionary of English Etymology) classify a steering oar as a rudder, others (Note: Joseph Needham, Lefèbre des Noëttes, K.S. Tom, Chung Chee Kit, S.A.M. Adshead, John K. Fairbank, Merle Goldman, Frank Ross, and Leo Block.) argue that the steering oar used in ancient Egypt and Rome was not a true rudder and define only the stern-mounted rudder used in ancient Han dynasty China as a true rudder. The steering oar can interfere with the handling of the sails (limiting any potential for long ocean-going voyages) while it was fit more for small vessels on narrow, rapid-water transport; the rudder did not disturb the handling of the sails, took less energy to operate by its helmsman, was better fit for larger vessels on ocean-going travel, and first appeared in ancient China during the 1st century AD. In regards to the ancient Phoenician (1550–300 BC) use of the steering oar without a rudder in the Mediterranean, Leo Block (2003) writes:

A single sail tends to turn a vessel in an upwind or downwind direction, and rudder action is required to steer a straight course. A steering oar was used at this time because the rudder had not yet been invented. With a single sail, frequent movement of the steering oar was required to steer a straight course; this slowed down the vessel because a steering oar (or rudder) course correction acts as a brake. The second sail, located forward, could be trimmed to offset the turning tendency of the mainsail and minimize the need for course corrections by the steering oar, which would have substantially improved sail performance.

Before the invention of the rudder, oversized oars called steering oars, or boards called steering boards, were used to control the direction of a ship or other watercraft. These are normally attached to the starboard side in larger vessels, though in smaller ones it is rarely if ever, attached.

=== Steering oar/gear ===
==== Ancient Egypt ====
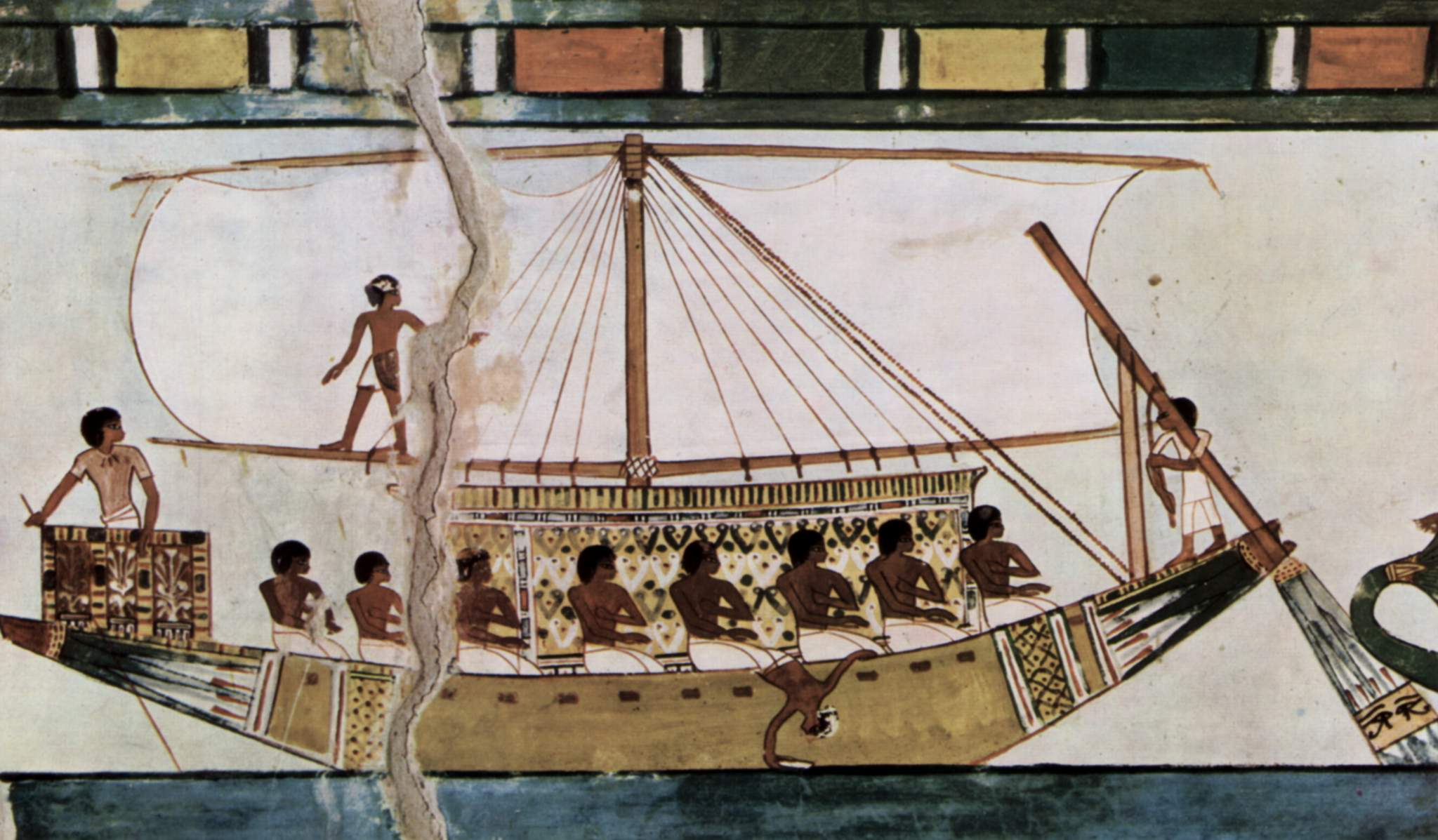
Stern-mounted steering oar of an Egyptian riverboat depicted in the Tomb of Menna (c. 1422–1411 BC)

Rowing oars set aside for steering appeared on large Egyptian vessels long before the time of Menes (3100 BC). In the Old Kingdom (2686–2134 BC) as many as five steering oars are found on each side of passenger boats. The tiller, at first a small pin run through the stock of the steering oar, can be traced to the fifth dynasty (2504–2347 BC). Both the tiller and the introduction of an upright steering post abaft reduced the usual number of necessary steering oars to one each side. Single steering oars put on the stern can be found in several tomb models of the time, particularly during the Middle Kingdom when tomb reliefs suggest them commonly employed in Nile navigation. The first literary reference appears in the works of the Greek historian Herodotus (484–424 BC), who had spent several months in Egypt: "They make one rudder, and this is thrust through the keel", probably meaning the crotch at the end of the keel (as depicted in the "Tomb of Menna").

==== Ancient Iran ====
In Iran, oars mounted on the side of ships for steering are documented from the 3rd millennium BCE in artwork, wooden models, and even remnants of actual boats.

==== Ancient Rome ====
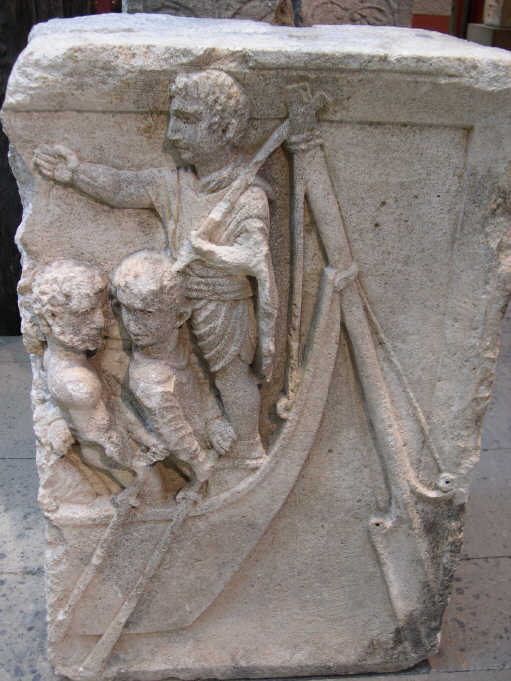
Steering oar of a Roman boat, 1st century AD (RG-Museum, Cologne)

Roman navigation used sexillie quarter steering oars that went in the Mediterranean through a long period of constant refinement and improvement so that by Roman times ancient vessels reached extraordinary sizes. The strength of the steering oar lay in its combination of effectiveness, adaptability and simpleness. Roman quarter steering oar mounting systems survived mostly intact through the medieval period.

By the first half of the 1st century AD, steering gear mounted on the stern were also quite common in Roman river and harbour craft as proved from reliefs and archaeological finds (Zwammerdam, Woerden 7). A tomb plaque of Hadrianic age shows a harbour tug boat in Ostia with a long stern-mounted oar for better leverage. The boat already featured a spritsail, adding to the mobility of the harbour vessel. Further attested Roman uses of stern-mounted steering oars includes barges under tow, transport ships for wine casks, and diverse other ship types. A large river barge found at the mouth of the Rhine near Zwammerdam featured a large steering gear mounted on the stern. According to new research, the advanced Nemi ships, the palace barges of emperor Caligula (37–41 AD), may have featured 14-m-long rudders.

=== Sternpost-mounted rudder ===
==== Ancient China ====
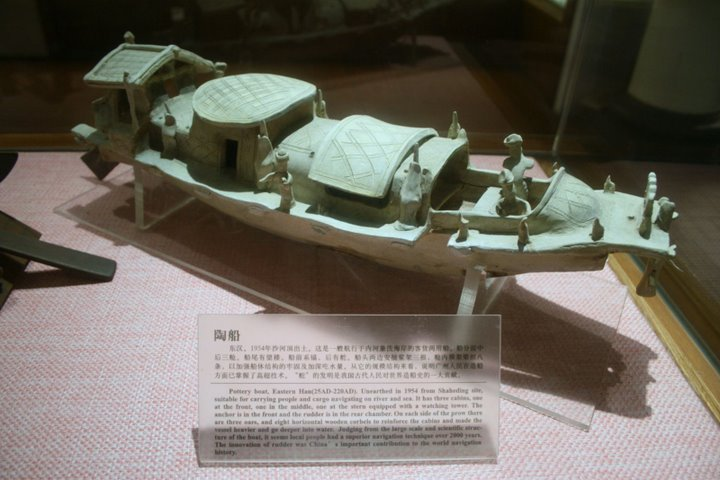
An Eastern Han (25–220 AD) Chinese pottery boat fit for riverine and maritime sea travel, with an anchor at the bow, a steering rudder at the stern, roofed compartments with windows and doors, and miniature sailors

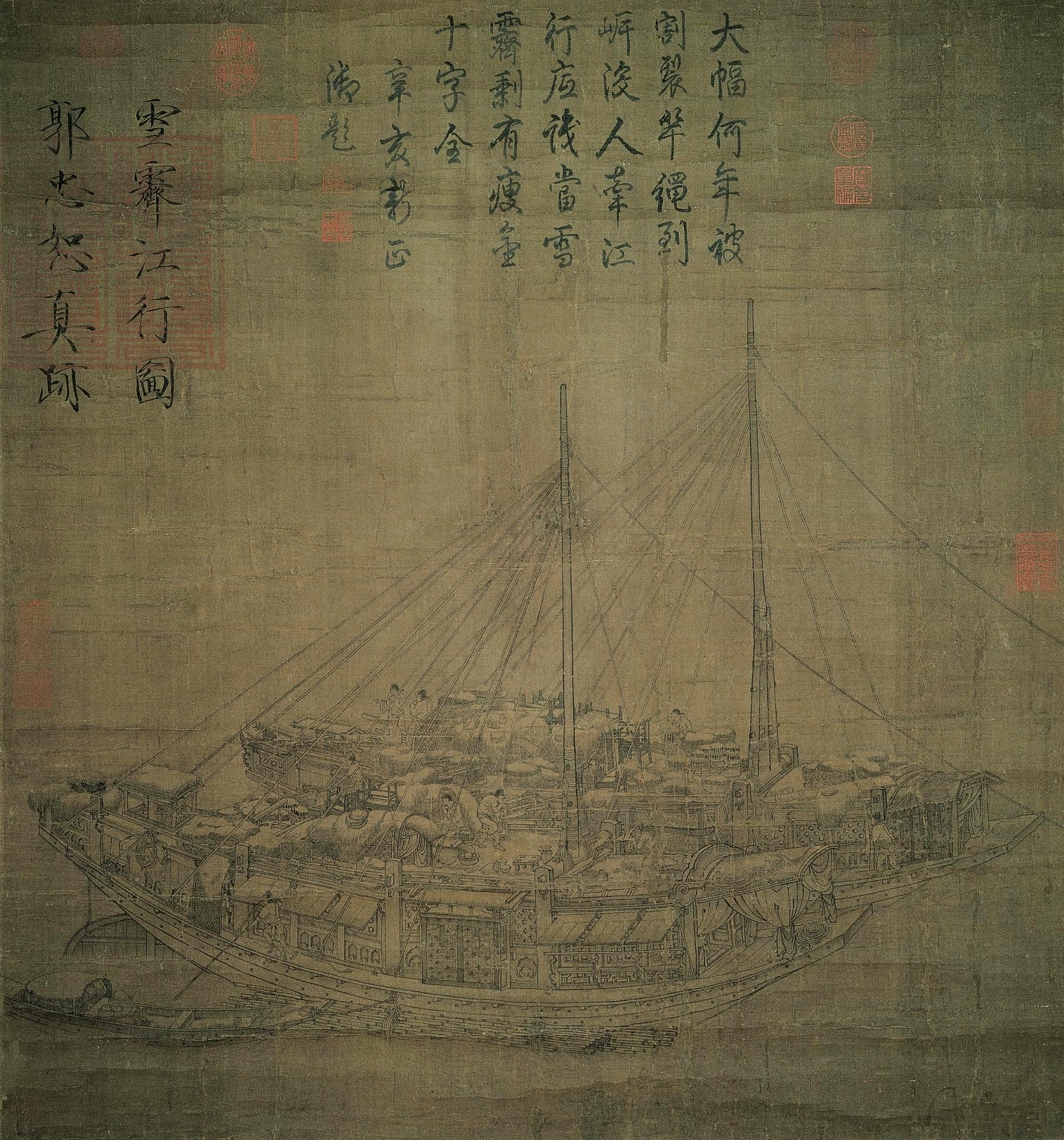
An early Song dynasty (960–1279) painting on silk of two Chinese cargo ships accompanied by a smaller boat, by Guo Zhongshu (c. 910–977 AD); notice the large sternpost-mounted rudder on the ship shown in the foreground

The world's oldest known depiction of a sternpost-mounted rudder can be seen on a pottery model of a Chinese junk dating from the 1st century AD during the Han dynasty, predating their appearance in the West by a thousand years. In China, miniature models of ships that feature steering oars have been dated to the Warring States period (c. 475–221 BC). Sternpost-mounted rudders started to appear on Chinese ship models starting in the 1st century AD. However, the Chinese continued to use the steering oar long after they invented the rudder, since the steering oar still had practical use for inland rapid-river travel. One of oldest known depictions of the Chinese stern-mounted rudder (duò 舵) can be seen on a 2-foot (61 cm) pottery model of a junk dating from the 1st century AD, during the Han dynasty (202 BC – 220 AD). It was discovered in Guangzhou in an archaeological excavation carried out by the Guangdong Provincial Museum and Academia Sinica of Taiwan in 1958. Within decades, several other Han dynasty ship models featuring rudders were found in archaeological excavations. The first solid written reference to the use of a rudder without a steering oar dates to the 5th century.

Chinese rudders are attached to the hull by means of wooden jaws or sockets, while typically larger ones were suspended from above by a rope tackle system so that they could be raised or lowered into the water. Also, many junks incorporated "fenestrated rudders" (rudders with holes in them, supposedly allowing for better control). Detailed descriptions of Chinese junks during the Middle Ages are known from various travellers to China, such as Ibn Battuta of Tangier, Morocco and Marco Polo of Venice, Italy. The later Chinese encyclopedist Song Yingxing (1587–1666) and the 17th-century European traveler Louis Lecomte wrote of the junk design and its use of the rudder with enthusiasm and admiration.

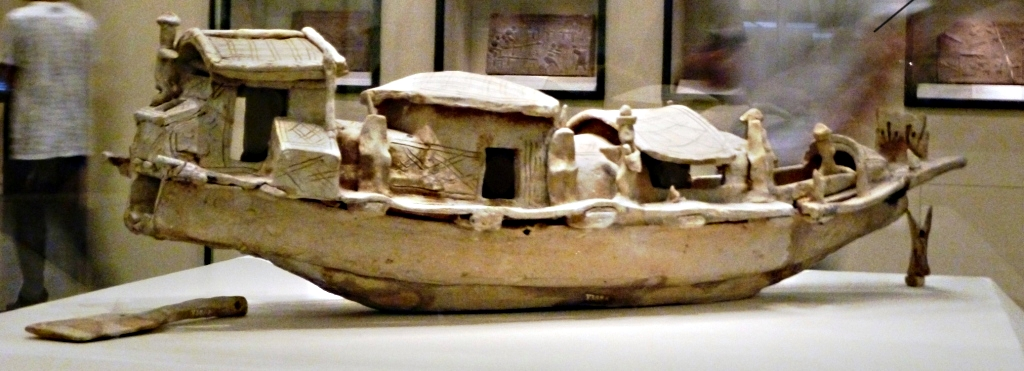
Pottery boat from Eastern Han dynasty showing the earliest known representation of a rudder

Paul Johnstone and Sean McGrail state that the Chinese invented the "median, vertical and axial" sternpost-mounted rudder, and that such a kind of rudder preceded the pintle-and-gudgeon rudder found in the West by roughly a millennium.

==== Ancient India ====
A Chandraketugarh (West Bengal) seal dated between the 1st and 3rd centuries AD depicts a steering mechanism on a ship named ''Indra of the Ocean'' (Jaladhisakra), which indicates that it was a sea-bound vessel.

==== Medieval Near East ====
Arab ships also used a sternpost-mounted rudder. On their ships "the rudder is controlled by two lines, each attached to a crosspiece mounted on the rudder head perpendicular to the plane of the rudder blade." The earliest evidence comes from the Ahsan al-Taqasim fi Marifat al-Aqalim ('The Best Divisions for the Classification of Regions') written by al-Muqaddasi in 985:

The captain from the crow's nest carefully observes the sea. When a rock is espied, he shouts: "Starboard!" or 'Port!" Two youths, posted there, repeat the cry. The helmsman, with two ropes in his hand, when he hears the calls tugs one or the other to the right or left. If great care is not taken, the ship strikes the rocks and is wrecked.

==== Medieval Europe ====
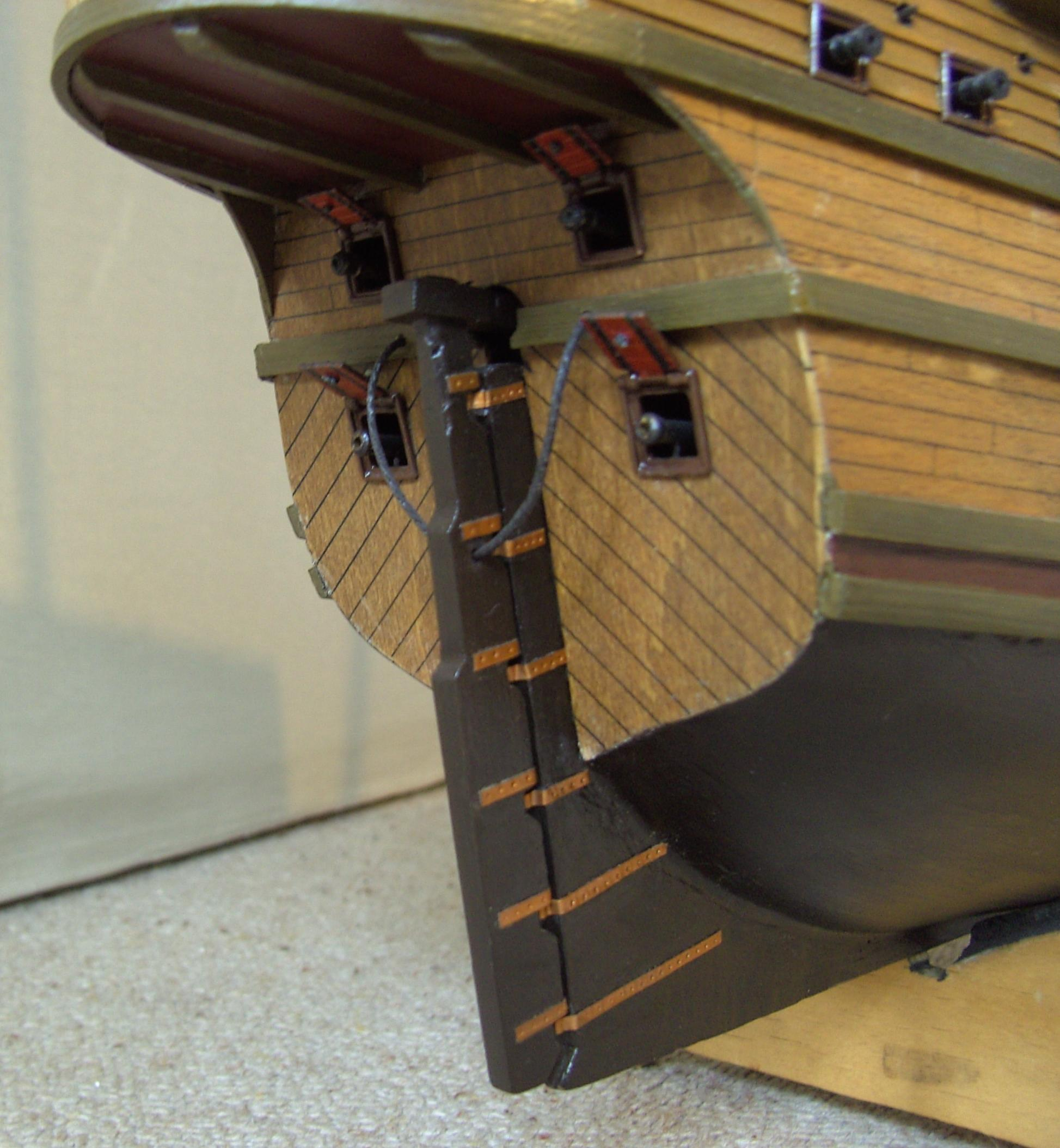
Pintle-and-gudgeon rudder of the Hanseatic league flagship Adler von Lübeck (1567–1581), the largest ship in the world at its time

Oars mounted on the side of ships evolved into quarter steering oars, which were used from antiquity until the end of the Middle Ages in Europe. As the size of ships and the height of the freeboards increased, quarter steering oars became unwieldy and were replaced by the more sturdy rudders with pintle and gudgeon attachment. While steering oars were found in Europe on a wide range of vessels since Roman times, including light war galleys in Mediterranean, the oldest known depiction of a pintle-and-gudgeon rudder can be found on church carvings of Zedelgem and Winchester dating to around 1180.

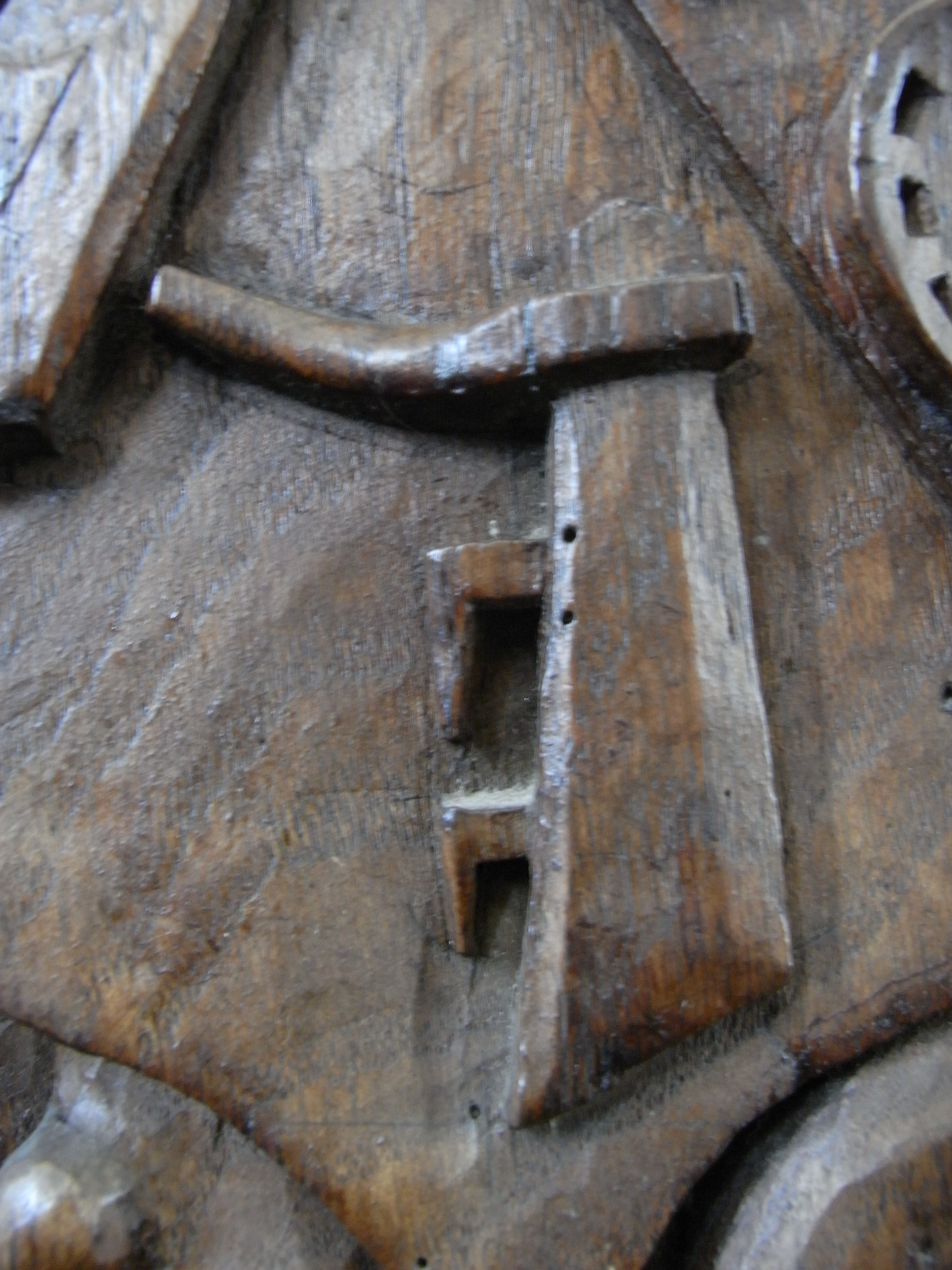
A ship's rudder carved in oak, 15th century, Bere Ferrers church, Devon. Heraldic badge of Cheyne and Willoughby families.

While earlier rudders were mounted on the stern by the way of rudderposts or tackles, the iron hinges allowed the rudder to be attached to the entire length of the sternpost in a permanent fashion. However, its full potential could only to be realized after the introduction of the vertical sternpost and the full-rigged ship in the 14th century. From the Age of Discovery onwards, European ships with pintle-and-gudgeon rudders sailed successfully on all seven seas.

Historian Joseph Needham holds that the stern-mounted rudder was transferred from China to Europe and the Islamic world during the Middle Ages.

==== Modern rudders ====
Conventional rudders have been essentially unchanged since Isambard Kingdom Brunel introduced the balanced rudder on the SS Great Britain in 1843 and the steering engine in the SS Great Eastern in 1866. If a vessel requires extra maneuverability at low speeds, the rudder may be supplemented by a manoeuvring thruster in the bow, or be replaced entirely by azimuth thrusters.

== Boat rudders details ==
Boat rudders may be either outboard or inboard. Outboard rudders are hung on the stern or transom. Inboard rudders are hung from a keel or skeg and are thus fully submerged beneath the hull, connected to the steering mechanism by a rudder post that comes up through the hull to deck level, often into a cockpit. Inboard keel hung rudders (which are a continuation of the aft trailing edge of the full keel) are traditionally deemed the most damage resistant rudders for off shore sailing. Better performance with faster handling characteristics can be provided by skeg hung rudders on boats with smaller fin keels.

Rudder post and mast placement defines the difference between a ketch and a yawl, as these two-masted vessels are similar. Yawls are defined as having the mizzen mast abaft (i.e. "aft of") the rudder post; ketches are defined as having the mizzen mast forward of the rudder post.

Small boat rudders that can be steered more or less perpendicular to the hull's longitudinal axis make effective brakes when pushed "hard over." However, terms such as "hard over," "hard to starboard," etc. signify a maximum-rate turn for larger vessels. Transom hung rudders or far aft mounted fin rudders generate greater moment and faster turning than more forward mounted keel hung rudders. Rudders on smaller craft can be operated by means of a tiller that fits into the rudder stock that also forms the fixings to the rudder foil. Craft where the length of the tiller could impede movement of the helm can be split with a rubber universal joint and the part adjoined the tiller termed a tiller extension. Tillers can further be extended by means of adjustable telescopic twist locking extension.

There is also the barrel type rudder, where the ship's screw is enclosed and can be swiveled to steer the vessel. Designers claim that this type of rudder on a smaller vessel will answer the helm faster.

=== Rudder control ===
Large ships (over 10,000 ton gross tonnage) have requirements on rudder turnover time. To comply with this, high torque rudder controls are employed. One commonly used system is the ram type steering gear. It employs four hydraulic rams to rotate the rudder stock (rotation axis), in turn rotating the rudder.

== Aircraft rudders ==
Movement caused by the use of rudder

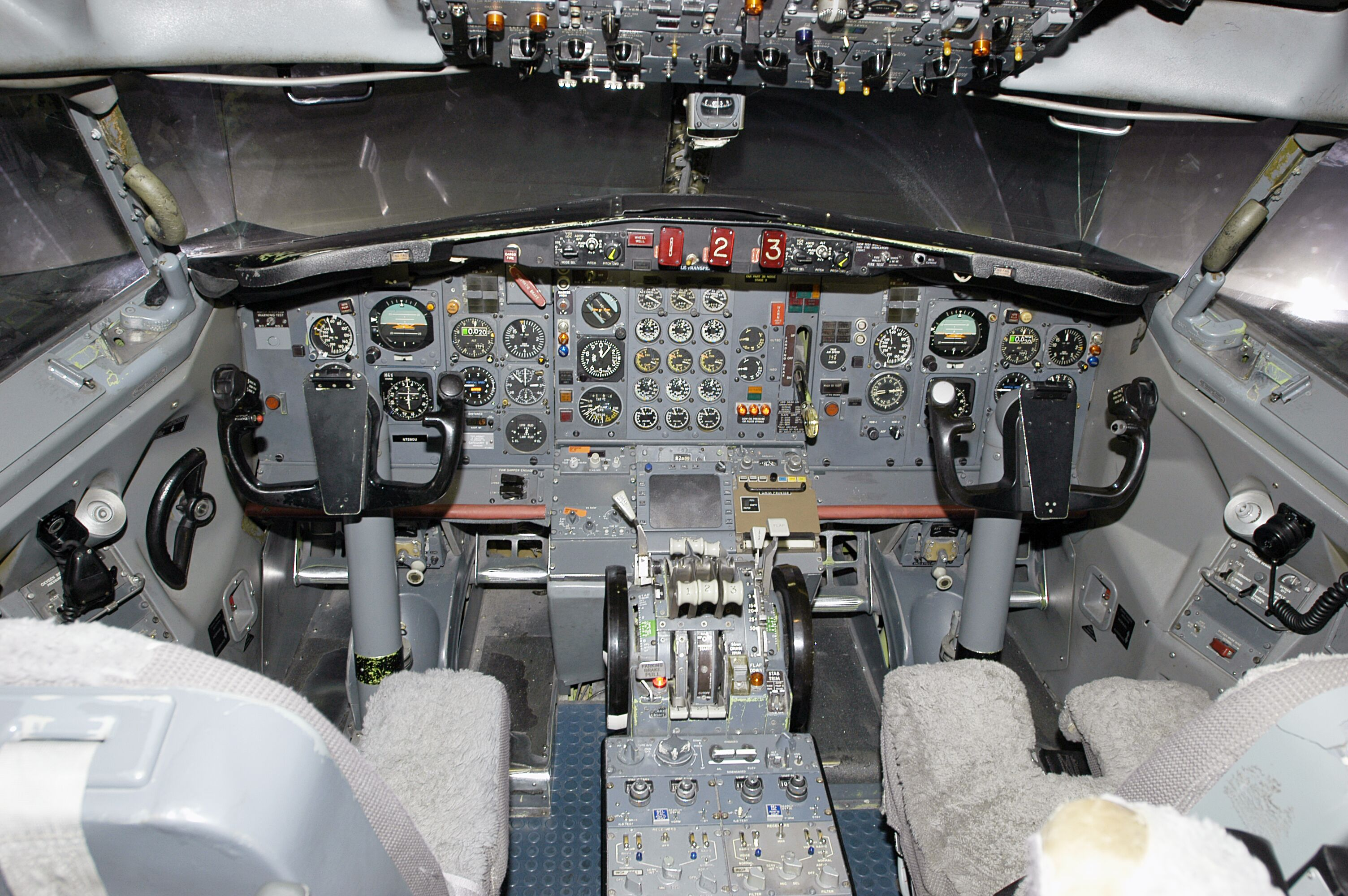
The rudder is controlled through rudder pedals on the bottom rear of the yoke in this photo of a Boeing 727 cockpit.

On an aircraft, a rudder is one of three directional control surfaces, along with the rudder-like elevator (usually attached to the horizontal tail structure, if not a slab elevator) and ailerons (attached to the wings), which control pitch and roll, respectively. The rudder is usually attached to the fin (or vertical stabilizer), which allows the pilot to control yaw about the vertical axis, i.e., change the horizontal direction in which the nose is pointing.

Unlike a ship, both aileron and rudder controls are used together to turn an aircraft, with the ailerons imparting roll and the rudder imparting yaw and also compensating for a phenomenon called adverse yaw. A rudder alone will turn a conventional fixed-wing aircraft, but much more slowly than if ailerons are also used in conjunction. Sometimes pilots may intentionally operate the rudder and ailerons in opposite directions in a maneuver called a slip or sideslip. This may be done to overcome crosswinds and keep the fuselage in line with the runway, or to lose altitude by increasing drag, or both.

Another technique for yaw control, used on some tailless aircraft and flying wings, is to add one or more drag-creating surfaces, such as split ailerons, on the outer wing section. Operating one of these surfaces creates drag on the wing, causing the plane to yaw in that direction. These surfaces are often referred to as drag rudders.

Rudders are typically controlled with pedals.

== See also ==
- Ship's wheel – Mechanism used to steer watercraft
- Azipod – Electric drive azimuth thruster
- Kitchen rudder – Type of directional propulsion system for vessels
- Pleuger rudder – Thruster assisted ship's rudder
- Schilling rudder – Low aspect ratio rudder with endplates
- Voith Schneider propeller – Perpendicular-axis marine propulsion system
