= Michael Flacks =

English businessman (born 1967)

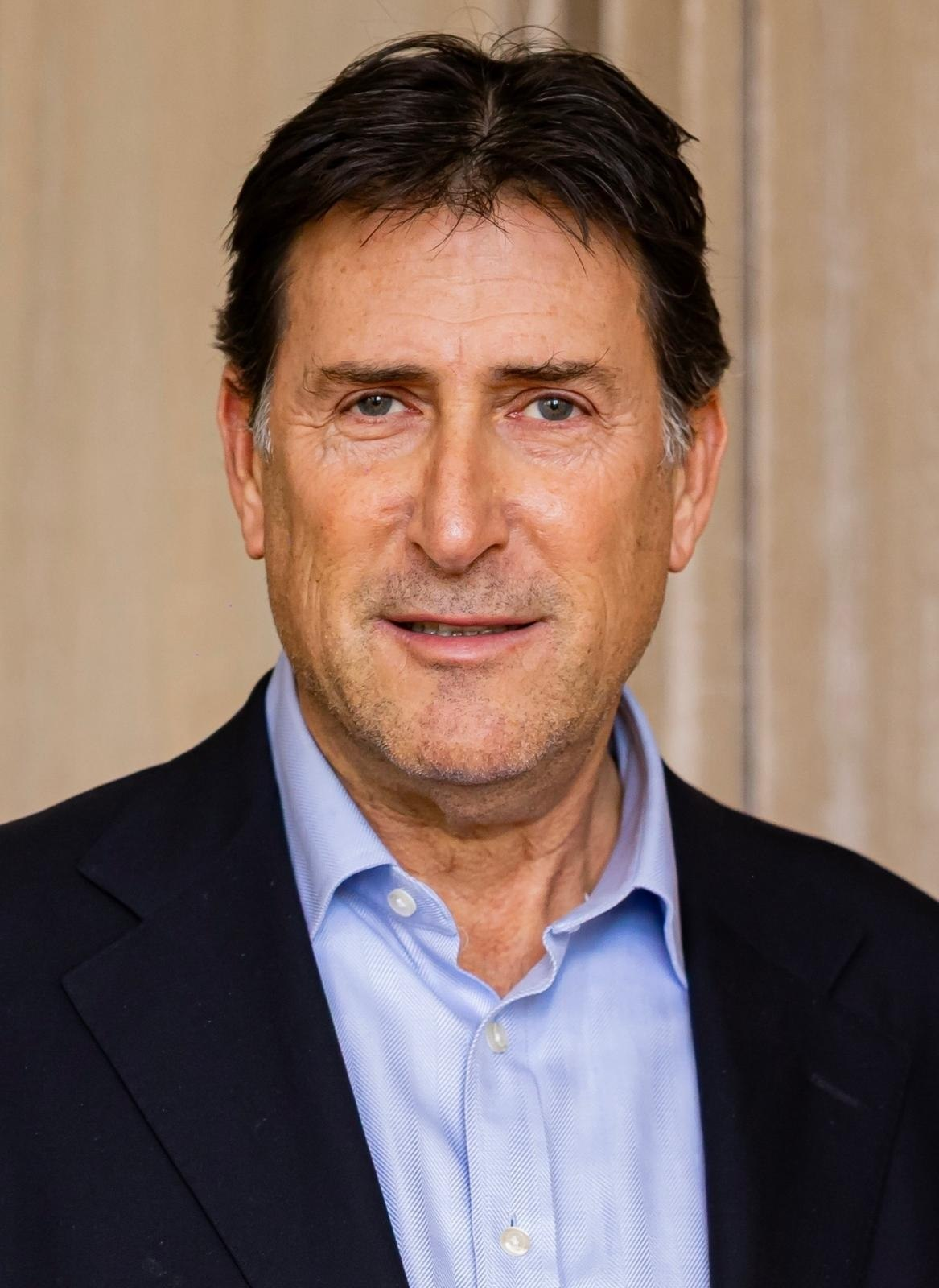
- Flacks in 2025 taken in Monaco
- Born: 1967 (age 58–59); Manchester, England
- Occupation: Investor
- Organization: Flacks Group
- Known for: Real estate investing

Michael Flacks (born 1967) is a British investor, and businessman. He is the founder and chairman of Flacks Group, a private investment company based in Miami, Florida. Flacks has been associated with investment strategies focused on acquiring and restructuring underperforming businesses and distressed assets.

== Career ==
In 1983, Flacks founded Flacks Group, and over the years, has been involved in acquiring and funding several businesses. As of June 2020, the group’s portfolio of businesses and real estate asset value exceeded $2.5 billion. By 2023, Flacks acquired four additional businesses with a valuation more than $250 million, according to data compiled by Bloomberg. Flacks also has interests in steel industry purchasing the steel plant in city of Taranto, Italy, from ILVA.

== Wealth ==
Flacks has appeared on the Sunday Times Rich List. In 2026, the publication estimated his net worth at £1.681 billion and ranked him 98th.

== Philanthropy ==
A 10-story community center is slated to be built in the center of Jerusalem by Colel Chabad, an Israeli food security nonprofit affiliated with the Chabad-Lubavitch movement, following a $5 million donation from Michael Flacks.

Flacks through Flacks Family Foundation announced a $3 million matching campaign for Colel Chabad at 2025.
