= Pleuger rudder =

Thruster assisted ship's rudder

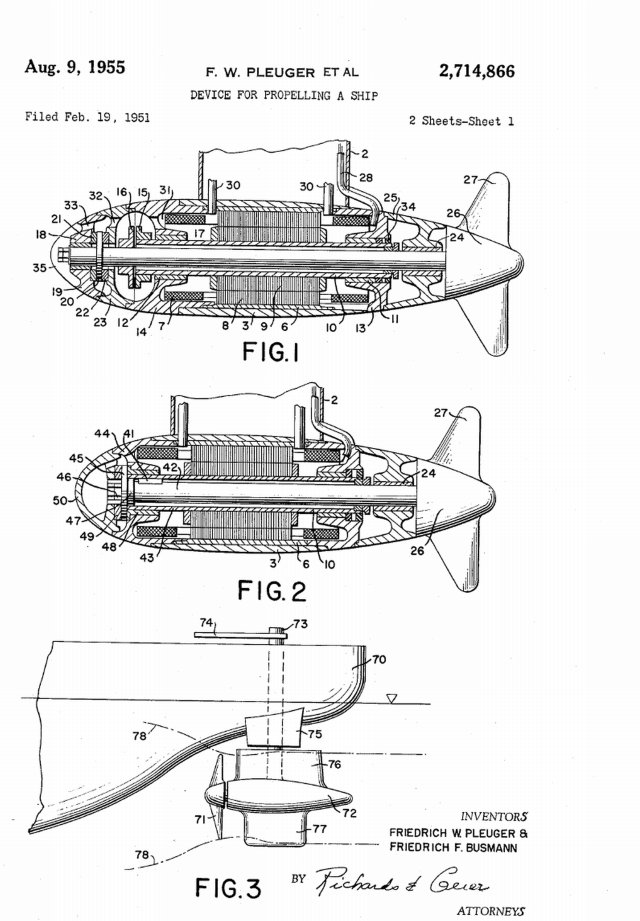
Patent for a device for propelling a ship

The Pleuger rudder (also known as a Dutch rudder) is a power assisted ship's rudder. It creates a flow of water in the direction the rudder points powered by an auxiliary electric motor. This aids maneuverability at low speeds greatly, since it operates on a similar principle to a thruster.

A ducted propeller is mounted as an integral part of the rudder and is fixed to it. The duct is a Kort nozzle and enables the propeller to develop more thrust than an unducted propeller.

The Pleuger rudder is necessarily mounted in the flow from the main engine's propeller in a ship with an odd number of propellers. If the Pleuger and the main engine are run at the same time, the Pleuger can often be torn away. The thrust produced by the Pleuger rudder is sufficient to power the ship in slow speed maneuvers when the force required to move the vessel is relatively small. The Pleuger rudder is meant to be assisting in the fast maneuverability of ships, in tight harbor operations. Thus, it is only an improvement of rudder by controlling the water flow pattern passing a rudder and thus giving it an artificial flow and thus an extra power to steer even in slow engine r.p.m. It is absolutely not a substitute for a propeller, without which the mammoth energy required to propel a ship through the water is hard to generate.

== See also ==
- Azipod – Electric drive azimuth thruster
- Kitchen rudder – Type of directional propulsion system for vessels
