= James Lowe (inventor) =

English screw-propeller inventor

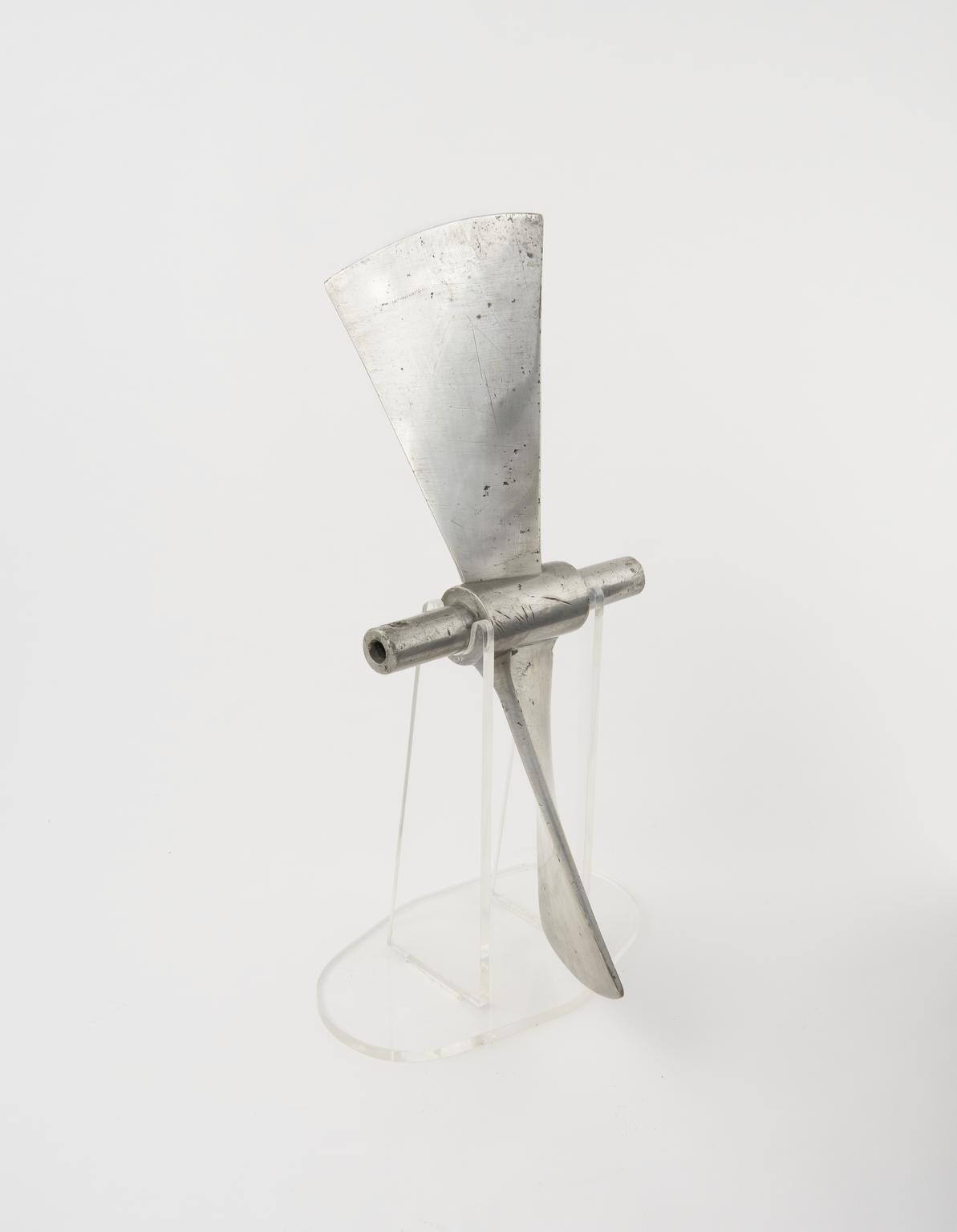
Patent model showing screw propeller with James Lowe's blade principle, unsigned, England, 1851–1852

James Lowe (1798–1866) was the English inventor of a screw propeller.

== Life ==
James Lowe was born in Rotherhithe, London, in 1798, to James and Elizabeth Lowe and baptised on 13 May. In 1811 Lowe began working for Edward Shorter, a master mechanic and Freeman of the City of London, who had in 1800 taken out a patent (GB patent 2367) for propelling vessels, which he had named "the perpetual sculling machine". On 2 November 1813, Lowe became an apprentice to Shorter but three years later in 1816 Lowe ran away and joined a whaling ship, the Amelia Wilson, but in 1825 and after three voyages returned to his master, with whom Lowe went into partnership. In 1834, Lowe left the partnership after losing money in propeller research.

Later Lowe went into business as machinist and a smoke-jack maker, and experimented on screw-propellers for ships. On 24 March 1838, he took out a patent (GB patent 7599) for "improvements in propelling vessels" by means of one or more curved blades, set or fixed on a revolving shaft below the water-line of the vessel. His propeller was first practically used in the steamship Wizard in 1837 for testing and prior to Lowe's patent application, and then in Rattler and Phœnix.

On 16 December 1844 Lowe brought an action in the Court of Queen's Bench against Penn & Co., engineers at Greenwich, for infringement of the patent. The evidence was contradictory, but it was shown that Lowe, although not the original inventor of propellers, was the inventor of a combination not before applied to the propulsion of vessels. This combination consisted of three parts:

1. a segment of a screw,
2. a segment of a screw applied below the watermark, so as to be totally immersed,
3. a segment of a screw applied on an axis below the water.

The jury gave a verdict in his favour. On 19 August 1852, he took out another patent (GB patent 14263), for his propeller.

Lowe spent his wife's fortune of about £3000 on his experiments, reduced himself to poverty, and never succeeded in obtaining any compensation for the use of his invention. Lowe died on 12 October 1866 when a wagon ran him over in the Blackfriars Road, London, killing him. Lowe is buried at St Mary's, Ewell, where his epitaph reads: ‘Sacred to the memory of James Lowe Esquire, who was born May 18, 1798, and met his death from an accident the 12th October 1866. He was the inventor of the segments of the screw propeller, in use since 1838; and his life, though unobtrusive, was not without great benefit to his country'.

== Family ==
Lowe married, on 30 May 1825, Mary Lowe, née Barnes (1804–1871), the eldest daughter of George Barnes, builder, of Ewell, Surrey. They had at least three sons and seven daughters:

- James Robert Seaman Lowe b. 1826
- Maria Lowe b. 1829
- Emma Lowe b. 1831
- Henrietta Lowe b. 1833
- Joseph Lowe b. 1836
- Elizabeth Lowe b. 1838
- Eligh Lowe b. 1838
- Amelia Lowe b. 1840
- George T Lowe b. 1844
- Rachel Lowe b. 1849 (married Edward (was Onispe) Lenoir

Their third daughter, Henrietta (under her married name Henrietta Vansittart) continued her father's experiments and in 1868 took out a patent (GB patent 2877) for a further improvement, which she called the "Lowe-Vansittart propeller". This was fitted to many government ships, and was found to be a valuable invention. It was also used on the RMS Lusitania.

== Sources ==
- This article incorporates text from a publication now in the public domain: "Lowe, James (d.1866)". Dictionary of National Biography. London: Smith, Elder & Co. 1885–1900.
