= Henrietta Vansittart =

English engineer and inventor (1833–1883)

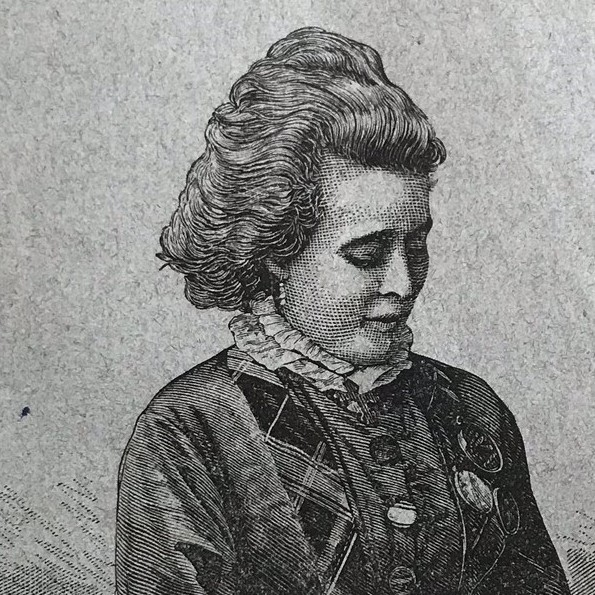
- Born: 1833; Ewell, Surrey, England
- Died: 8 February 1883 (aged 49–50); Gosforth, England
- Occupation: engineer
- Known for: creating a novel design of propeller

Henrietta Vansittart, née Lowe (1833 – 8 February 1883) was an English engineer and inventor, awarded a patent for a screw propeller called the Lowe-Vansittart propeller. She was self-trained and she is considered to be one of the first female engineers, with her concentration being on ship propulsion.

== Early life ==
Henrietta Vansittart, born Henrietta Lowe, was born in Ewell, Surrey in 1833. She was one of eight children born to James and Marie Lowe, née Barnes. Her father James Lowe was a blacksmith-inventory working on ship propulsion and applying for related patents using his wife's money and connections.

Vansittart's family lived in poor conditions, with her father occupation being a machinist and smoke jack maker. On 23 March 1838, Vansittart's father James Lowe took out a patent for a new screw propeller but made no significant financial gain from his contributions due to competition in infringement battles. By the 1850, James Lowe nearly ran his family into bankruptcy, despite the adoption of his general scheme for submerged propellers. This led to Vansittart's marriage in 1855 to a Lieutenant named Frederick Vansittart (1827-1902), a lieutenant in the 14th Dragoons (later the Hussars) who was recently returned from the Second Anglo-Sikh War. They married at the British Embassy in Paris on 25 July 1855, and set up the marital home in Clarges Street, Mayfair.

== Engineering work and career ==
There is no documentation on her education: Vansittart was proclaimed a self-trained engineer. As was common for many of the women in engineering in the 19th and early 20th century, Vansittart was introduced to engineering through a family connection, which in her case was her father, James Lowe.

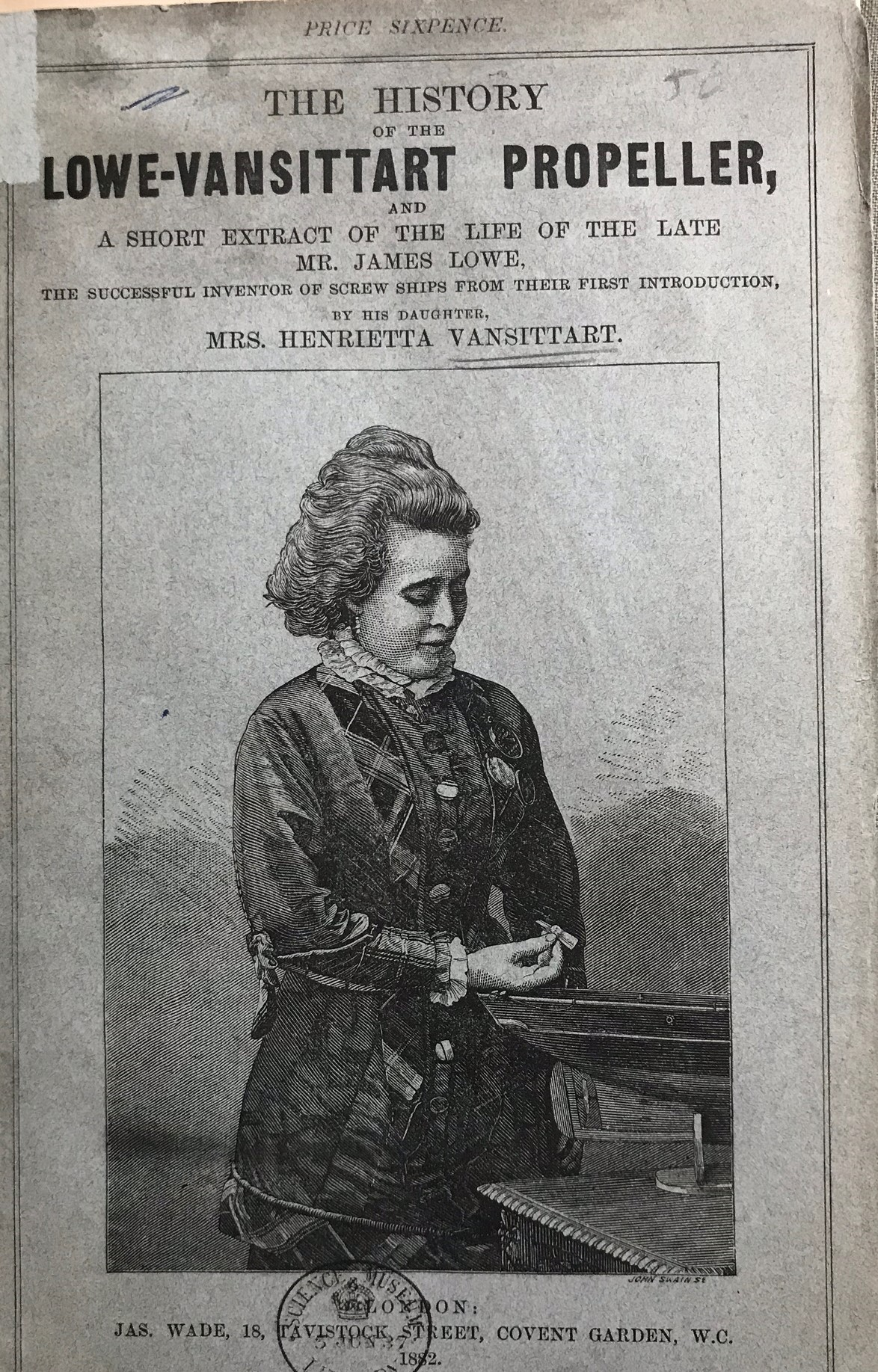
Article by Henrietta Vansittart, published in 1882

Shortly after her marriage, Vansittart began to study her father's work on ship propulsion. She had accompanied her father on HMS Bullfinch to test out a new version of his screw propeller, which began her interest, in 1857. The Lowe propeller had been fixed to many British warships by this time, but James Lowe never saw any financial reward due to infringement battles. When Vansittart's father died in 1866, after being run over by a carriage, she began working and experimenting in earnest, perhaps looking for the recognition her father never had in his lifetime.

In 1868, Vansittart was awarded a patent (British Patent no 2877), for an improvement on her father's work – what she called the Lowe-Vansittart propeller. Her argument for the propeller was that it allowed ships to move faster and smoother, while using less fuel. Her work went on to be fitted on many ships, including HMS Druid, the Scandinavian, and the RMS Lusitania. In addition, she also took out an American patent (US Patent 89712 granted in 1869), which was on the construction of screw propellers. In the 1860s, Henrietta improved the design with curved rather than straight blades for greater efficiency, and her home was filled with the development models she built and tested.

The Lowe-Vansittart Propeller was awarded a first-class diploma at the International Exhibition in Kensington in 1871, a first class diploma and medal at the 1872 Dublin, 1875 Paris, 1876 Belgian, 1879 Sydney Exhibition, 1880 Melbourne and 1881 Adelaide Exhibitions, as well as other awards at the Royal Cornwall and Naples Maritime Exhibitions.

For her work on ship propulsion, Vansittart won many awards, was mentioned by name in various newspapers, such as The Times and her invention took her to several exhibitions all over the world.

In 1876, Vansittart was the first female to write, read, and illustrate her own diagrams and drawings for a scientific article presented at Association of Foreman Engineers and Draughtsmen. A pamphlet written by Vansittart, based on this paper, was published in 1882, entitled The History of the Lowe Vansittart Propeller and a short extract of the life of the late Mr James Lowe, the successful inventor of screw ships from their first introduction. This pamphlet indicates her dedication to the work and legacy of her father, as well as illustrating her technical knowledge of the Lowe Vansittart propeller.

== Personal life ==
In 1859, Vansittart began an affair with Edward Bulwer-Lytton, a well-known novelist and politician, which lasted for 12 years. The affair was known throughout both families, as well as the House of Commons, of which Bulwer-Lytton was a member. Bulwer-Lytton gave Vansittart financial assistance over the course of this period, and, though the affair ended in 1871, when he died in 1873, Bulwer-Lytton left £12,000 in his will for Vansittart and her husband, though her husband's sum was smaller. Letters from Vansittart to Bulwer-Lytton show that it was a tumultuous, passionate affair, which played an important role in Vansittart's life for many years.

Despite its growing popularity in the second half of the nineteenth century, Vansittart was not involved in the suffrage movement. She spoke publicly on this, stating that she believed a woman's place was in the home, unless she needed to vindicate the cause of a family member, such as she felt she had to do for the legacy of her father.

== Death and legacy ==
In late 1882, Vansittart visited the Tynemouth Exhibition, and she was found wandering the streets by police, confused. She exhibited signs of mania and violent tendencies. She was ordered by magistrates to St Nicholas's Hospital, Gosforth, where she was admitted on 19 September 1882. After five months at the asylum, she died of acute mania and anthrax on 8 February 1883.

In the obituary for Vansittart in the Journal of the London Association of Foreman Engineers and Draughtsmen it stated that 'she was a remarkable personage with a great knowledge of engineering matters and considerable versatility of talent', as well as 'how cheery and thoughtful for the happiness of others she was …'

The obituary also claims that Vansittart was the first woman to write and read a scientific paper, illustrated with diagrams and drawings of her own, before a scientific institution. With the work that she accomplished, ships could now move faster and use less fuel, while being maneuvered better in reverse. She did this at a time in history when there were no female engineers, with no formal scientific or engineering training. Her work is considered by some to be "one of the most important nautical inventions of the 19th century." However, she never paid the fee to renew the patent. A scale model of the Lowe-Vansittart propeller is held in the Science Museum Group's collections, which she donated to the museum in 1874.

Vansittart never had children, and her husband died in 1902.
