= Doncaster (1792 ship) =

British merchant ship (1792–1835)

History

Great Britain
- Name: Doncaster
- Namesake: Doncaster
- Owner: 18 February 1793: George Burdon, Newcastle and Matthew Smith & Robert Scotland, South Shields; 16 October 1806: Robert Scotland, South Shields; 21 December 1807: George Burdon, Newcastle; 18 February 1812: William Harle, Newcastle; 4 May 1812: William Harle, Newcastle and Edward Weatherly, Newmarket; 26 March 1825: John, James, William & Eleanor Harle, Newcastle and Edward Weatherly, Newmarket; 30 March 1829: James Harle, Newcastle and Edward Weatherly, Newmarket
- Builder: Lockwood Brodrick, South Shields
- Launched: 1792
- Fate: Wrecked 24 May 1835

General characteristics
- Tons burthen: 330, or 350, or 363, or 368 (bm)
- Length: 103 ft 5 in (31.5 m)
- Beam: 29 ft 0 in (8.8 m)
- Draught: 19 ft 0 in (5.8 m)
- Depth: 19 ft 0 in (5.8 m)
- Sail plan: Ship-rigged; later barque
- Armament: 1797: 2 × 6-pounder + 4 × 4-pounder guns; 1813: 8 × 6-pounder guns

Doncaster was launched in 1792 at South Shields. She spent many years as a transport. It was during this period that she became, during an experimental trial, the first British ship to be propelled by a propeller. Later, she traded across the North Atlantic with Quebec and north. She was wrecked in ice in 1835 off Cape North, Cape Breton Island.

== Career ==
Doncaster first appeared in Lloyd's Register (LR), in 1794.

| Year | Master | Owner | Trade | Source |
|---|---|---|---|---|
| 1794 | Scotland | G.Burdon | London transport | LR |
| 1797 | Scotland; F.Paterson | G.Burdon | London transport | LR |

In February 1800, the English inventor and engineer Edward Shorter proposed using a propeller attached to a rod angled down temporarily deployed from the deck above the waterline of a vessel and thus requiring no water seal. The device was intended only to assist becalmed sailing vessels. He tested it on Doncaster in Gibraltar and at Malta and the device was able to achieve a speed of 1.5 mph (2.4 km/h). She thus became the first British vessel to be moved by a propeller.

| Year | Master | Owner | Trade | Source |
|---|---|---|---|---|
| 1802 | Paterson; J.Shout (or Chout) | G.Burdon | London transport London–Gibraltar | LR |

Lloyd's Register ceased carrying Doncaster in 1810, but she still appeared in the Register of Shipping (RS).

| Year | Master | Owner | Trade | Source & notes |
|---|---|---|---|---|
| 1809 | J.Chout | G.Bourdon | Liverpool–Gibraltar | LR |
| 1809 | J.Smith | G.Burdon | Shields–London | RS; thorough repair 1806 |

Lloyd's List showed Doncaster, Smith, master, sailing from Quebec on 24 September 1808. Ship arrival and departure data suggest that he had been master of Doncaster since at least 1807, and that she had sailed to the West Indies and Quebec. Doncaster reappeared in Lloyd's Register in 1813. The information did not always agree with that in the Register of Shipping.

| Year | Master | Owner | Trade | Source & notes |
|---|---|---|---|---|
| 1813 | Pinckney | W.Hearn | London transport | RS; new wales 1813 & good repair 1813 |
| 1813 | W.Binckley | W.Hearn | London transport | LR; new decks 1807 & thorough repair 1812 |
| 1815 | Binkley; D.Pinckney | W.Haven | London transport Liverpool–Newfoundland | LR; new decks 1807 & thorough repair 1812 |
| 1816 | Pinkey; Robinson | W.Hearn; Harle & Co. | Liverpool–Newfoundland; Liverpool–Quebec | RS; new wales 1813 & good repair 1813 |
| 1819 | Robinson | Harle & Co. | Newcastle–Quebec | RS; new wales 1813 & good repair 1813 |
| 1820 | H.Marshall | Harle & Co. | London–Quebec | RS; new wales 1812 & good repair 1818 |

On 25 November 1824, Doncaster, of Newcastle, Marshall, master, was in the harbour at Portsmouth. She was discharging timber from Quebec when she was forced on shore, where she grounded.

| Year | Master | Owner | Trade | Source & notes |
|---|---|---|---|---|
| 1826 | H.Marshall | Harle & Co. | Liverpool–Quebec | LR |
| 1827 | H.Marshall | Harle & Co. Captain & Co. | Liverpool–Quebec; London–Nova Scotia | LR; large repair 1818 & small repairs 1826 |
| 1828 | H.Marshall | Harle & Co. Captain & Co. | Liverpool–Quebec; London–Nova Scotia | LR; large repair 1818 & small repairs 1826 |
| 1830 | H.Marshall; G.Winships | Harle & Co. | Liverpool | LR; large repair 1818 & small repairs 1826 |
| 1832 | G.Winships; J.Foster | Harle & Co. | London–Miramichi, New Brunswick | LR; large repair 1818, & small repairs 1826 & 1832 |

== Fate ==
Doncaster, Foster, master, was lost on 24 May 1835, off Cape North, Cape Breton Island. Ice crushed her and she sank off St. Paul Island, Nova Scotia She was on a voyage from Newcastle upon Tyne to Miramichi. The brig Dorothys rescued Doncaster's six crew members.
