= Edward Shorter =

English engineer and inventor (1767–1836)

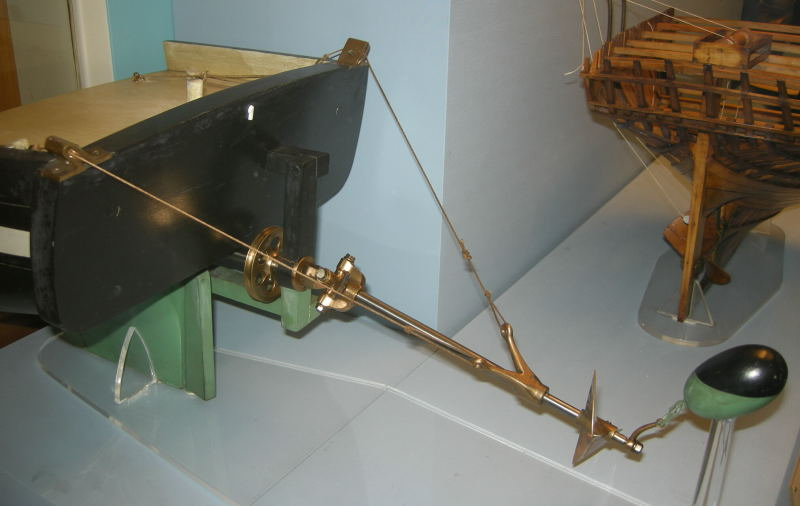
A scale model of Edward Shorter's 1800 propeller patent

Edward Shorter (1767-1836) was an English engineer and inventor of several useful inventions, including an early screw propeller.

== Early life ==
Edward was born in London on 3 December 1767 in the parish of St Sepulchre, Newgate to Robert and Ann Shorter. His father Robert was an impoverished weaver, and while he had been indentured with the Company of Weavers in Basingstoke Street in 1756, and completed his apprenticeship, it is clear that he had insufficient income to support the family. Some time around 1770 the family had to move into the parish workhouse (Chick Lane) to support themselves. Edward’s sister Rachel died in 1774 in the Workhouse and Edward was discharged in 1775.

== Life ==
It is unclear when and through whom Edward learned his trade, however prior to 1798 he had obtained Freedom of the City and was working as a clockmaker in Giltspur Street, London. Together with colleague William Anthony, the renowned watchmaker of Red Lion Street, he succeeded in obtaining his first patent dated 8 November 1798 "for a method of equalising and facilitating the draught of carriages and easing the body of carriages, by hanging the same, also for more securely fixing tents and marquees and by which invention is applicable to other purposes"

On 4 February 1800, Shorter patented an early variant of the screw propeller, Patent No. GB2371. He described his invention as a "perpetual sculling machine". Intended to assist becalmed sailing vessels. it allowed a ship to be maneuvered in the harbor when there was no wind. The drive shaft was guided horizontally above the water line through the ship's stern. A hinge was attached to the shaft so that it was submerged into the water with the propeller. On 4 July 1802, Captain Frederick Whitworth Aylmer and Captain Richard Goodwin Keats of the British Navy testified that the heavily loaded cargo ship Doncaster could be moved at a speed of 1.5 knots off the coast of Gibraltar with the help of the invention. Doncaster was thus the first British ship to be moved using a propeller. Two months later on 2 September 1802 in Malta, Admiral Sir Richard Bickerton also testified to the functionality of the propeller. The certificate for the successful testing of the propeller near Malta is today in the Kelvingrove Art Gallery and Museum in Glasgow. While Shorter did claim that his propelling system could be powered by a steam engine, there is no evidence he further developed this idea or sought to register an exclusive right to it. A scale model of his screw propeller invention is on display in the London Science Museum and is shown in the image above.

At this time Shorter was operating out of the "Ships Propeller Office" in New Crane, Wapping. In March 1803, Shorter obtained a Patent for an "improved apparatus for working of pumps in ships (by means of a wheel set in motion by the water)"

In January 1805, he filed a specification for a "mechanical apparatus, by which the raising of ballast is rendered more easy, cheap and expeditious, and which may be applied to other useful purposes"

The costs involved in registering patents was a significant sum of money by the standards of the day -approx £110 per patent. By 1810, Shorter’s finances had become depleted and, unable to pay his creditors, faced debtors prison. He was sent to prison on 21 May 1810. On 1 May 1811, Shorter made a declaration of his assets to his creditors as part of a plea for debtor relief, and was discharged from prison soon after this.

Shorter resumed his machinist’s enterprise at new premises in Union Street, Southwark, and was joined by James Lowe, a young lad of 13 years age. James was evidently a promising worker, and was apprenticed to Shorter on 2 November 1813.

After discharge from prison, Shorter appears more focused on regaining his financial position. We only find evidence of one additional patent filed in his own name. In May 1812, a patent was granted to Shorter for "improvements in the construction of tunnels and subterranean places".

In 1817 a patent was granted relating to improvements in carriages, and listed a Mr. George Wyk Esq. from Somerset as the principal inventor. It is likely that Mr Wyk was the financier of this patent.

In 1825, James Lowe returned back from three oceangoing journeys and formed a partnership with Shorter. This was short lived however, and the partnership was dissolved on 18th day of November 1825.

In October 1825, Shorter wrote to the Lord Mayor, in an attempt to persuade him to influence the adoption of his screw propeller, on the basis of greatly improved safety compared with the incumbent paddle wheel driven boats. In the letter Shorter claimed a successful trial in the Goldsmith’s company’s barge early that year.

In 1826 Shorter - along with James Lowe - fitted 'two parts of a screw' to the Royal George Barge but it was unsuccessful.

In 1834 Lowe ceased working with Shorter and in January 1835 Shorter ceased trading.

Shorter died on 10 February 1836 aged 68. His machine shop assets, including a new type of roasting jack he had developed, were put up for sale in June 1836.

== Family ==
Edward married Elizabeth Summerfield in 1795 at St Stephan's Coleman St. Together they had six children. Of these only three lived to adult age. Elizabeth Sophia emigrated to New Zealand in 1841. Mary Ann emigrated to North America.
