= Folding propeller =

Propeller with blades that fold open

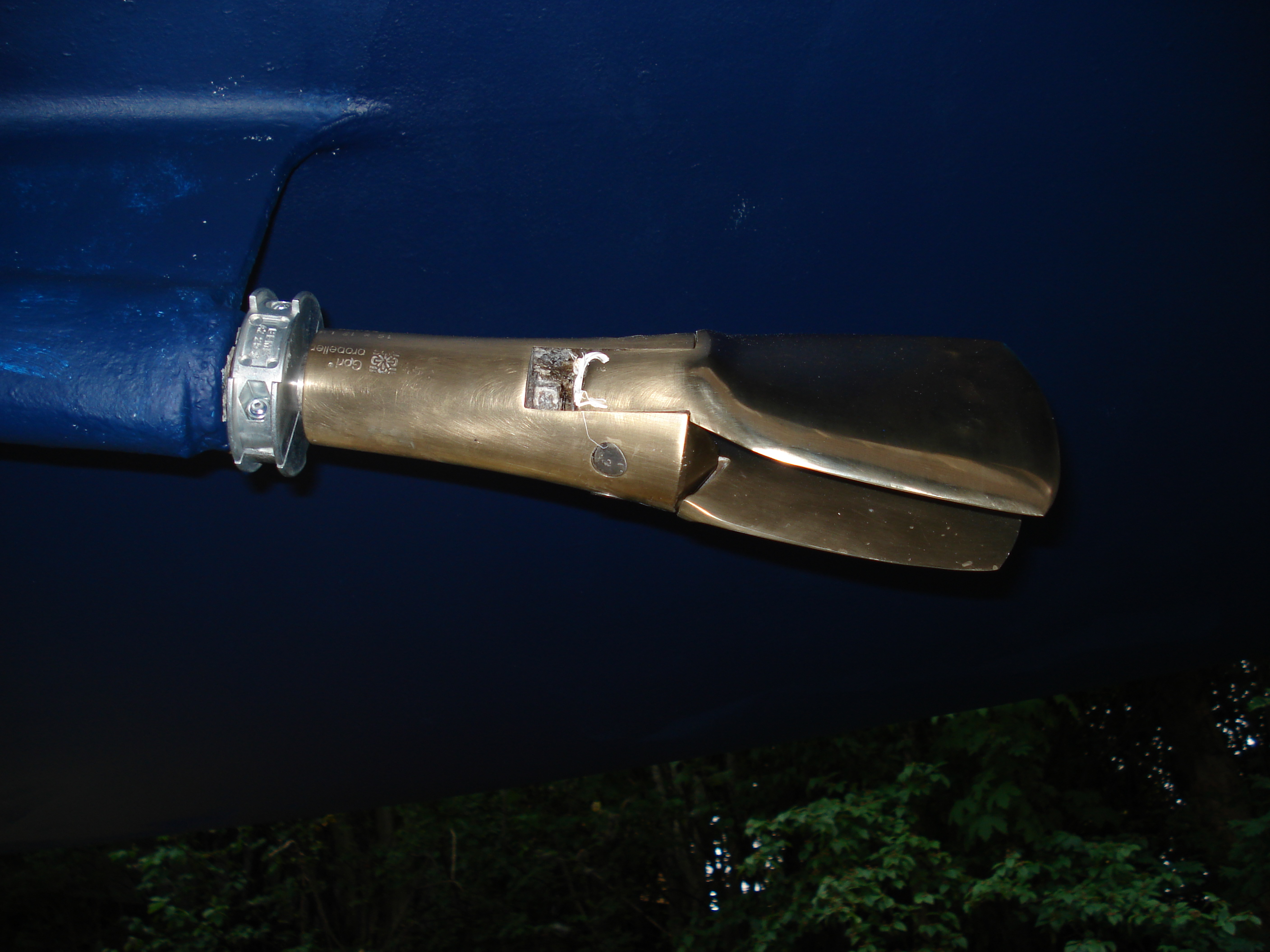
A feathered two-bladed Gori folding propeller.

A folding propeller is a type of propeller whose blades automatically fold out when the engine is turning, and then fold back (or "feather") when the engine stops. Folding propellers are found on sailing yachts, on model airplanes, and increasingly on self-launching gliders and small motor gliders, such as the Aériane Swift PAS. Their purpose of folding propellers is to reduce drag when sailing or soaring, respectively.

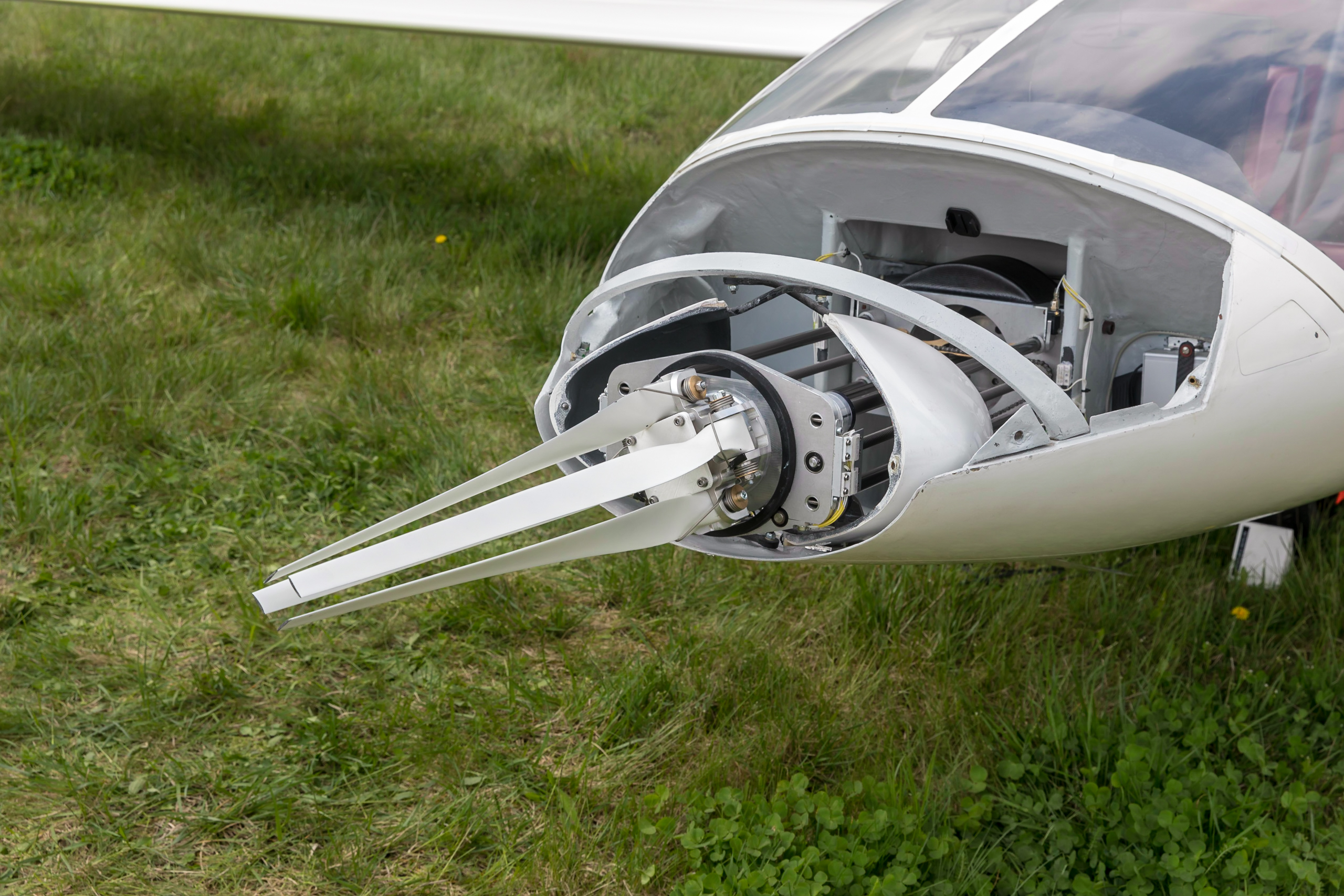
Folding propeller of a motor glider. (The upper cowling has been removed for this photo).

Folding propellers are spun outwards by centrifugal force when the engine is turning, but when the engine stops, the pressure of airflow or waterflow forces the blades back. Typically, the blades are geared together so that they open and close in unison. Folding propellers used mainly to be two-bladed, but 3-bladed and 4-bladed versions are now available.

The arguments for and against folding propellers are:

Pros	Cons
Folding propellers reduce drag while not in use, thereby allowing for more speed or reduced fuel consumption.	Folding propellers are no more efficient than fixed blade propellers, and have much poorer performance in astern.
Less noise and vibration than fixed blades when not in use, since fluid flow will not cause the propeller to rotate.	They cost more than fixed propellers.
	For marine propellers, plant growth and crustaceans can hamper the propeller's operation, but this becomes a problem only if the boat is unused for lengthy periods.

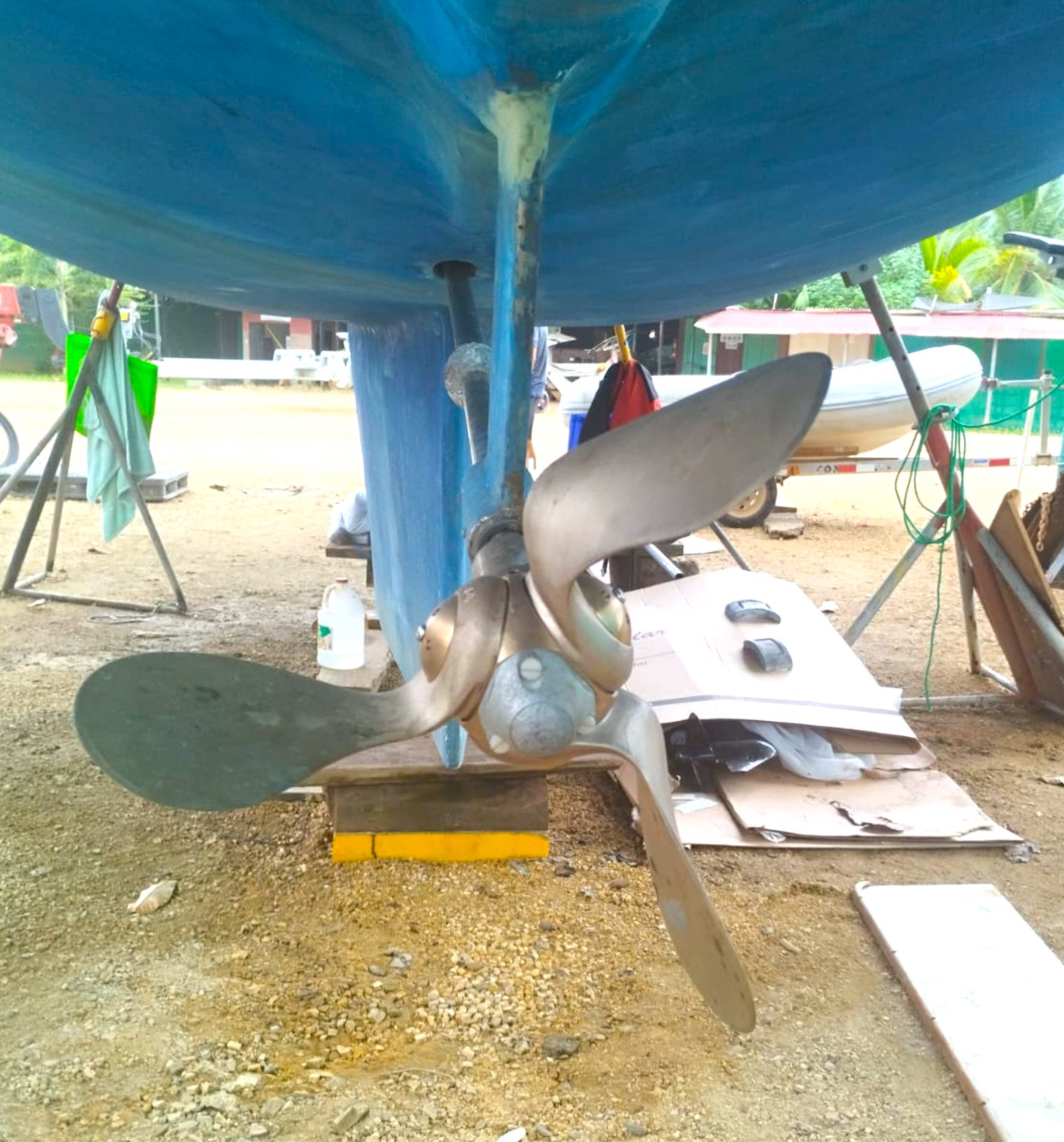
Bruntons Autoprop on Irwin 44 sailing cruiser

Self-actuating variable pitch propellers

When motoring, a self-feathering propeller is not more efficient than a fixed bladed prop, as neither type can adopt an optimal blade angle. Exceptions are the Bruntons Autoprop, the Darglow FeatherStream, and the V-Prop, all of which are not merely folding propellers, but are self-actuating variable-pitch propellers. On a boat, most propellers are much less effective in astern, and this is particularly true of folding propellers; whereas the Brunton AutoProp and Darglow FeatherStream are equally effective astern as ahead. Further, the Brunton Autoprop automatically and the V-Prop set their blades to the optimum pitch.

Another design, the Gori Overdrive propeller has asymmetrical blades which are geared together. The Gori incorporates an "overdrive" feature which is not self-actuating, but which requires input from the skipper. One engages overdrive as follows: reverse at a speed of 1-2 knots, and then suddenly give a burst of forward throttle. The prop does not have time to adopt the forward profile and is stuck in the reverse mode while going forward. This gives the propeller a coarser profile, allowing the engine to run at significantly lower revs, reducing noise, wear, and fuel consumption.

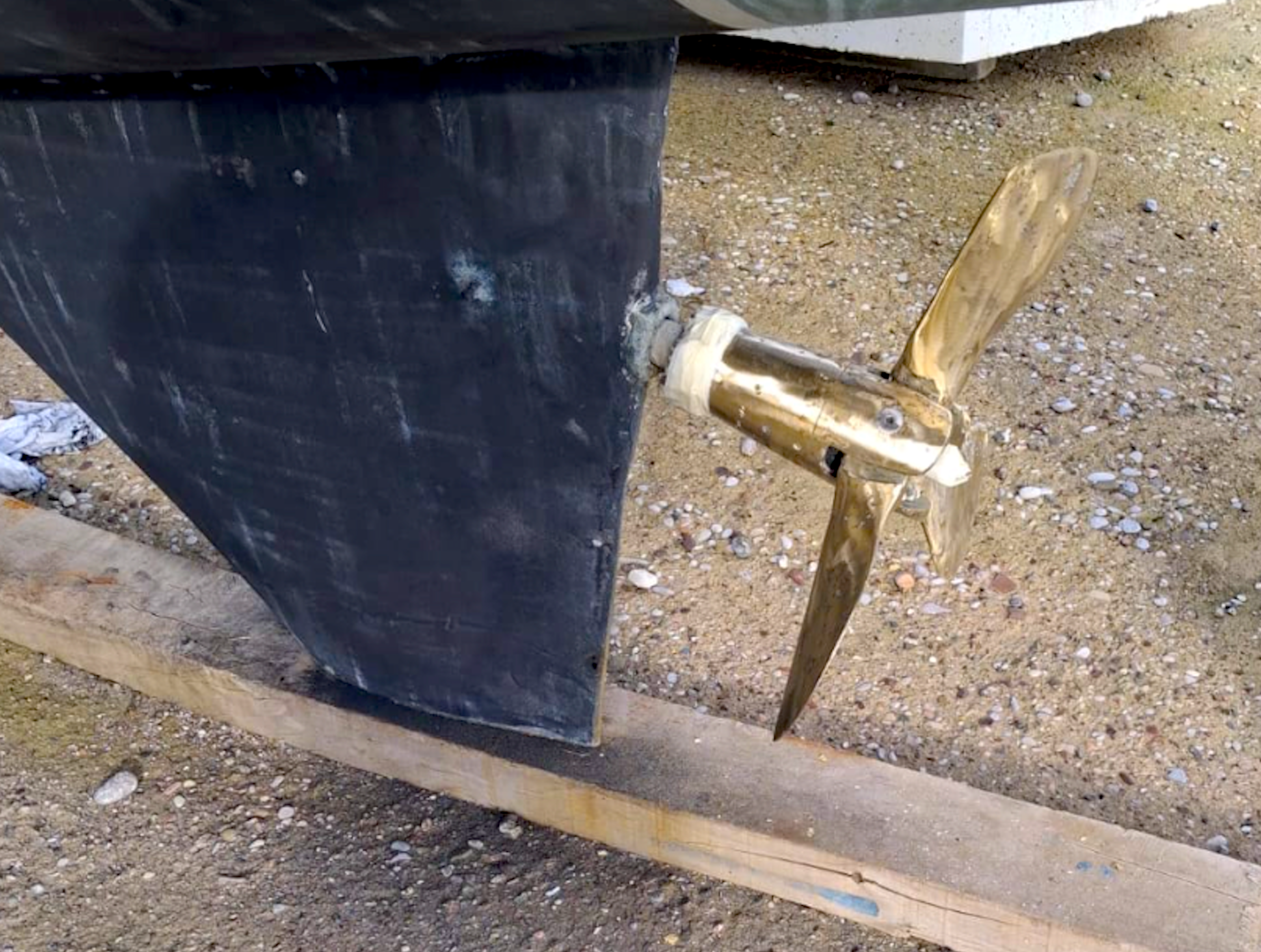
Gori folding propeller on a Catana 582 catamaran
