= Modular propeller =

Propeller assembled from components

Unlike a standard one-piece boat or aircraft propeller, a modular propeller is made up of using a number of replaceable parts, typically:

- a set of matched blades;
- a propeller hub; and
- an end cap to retain the blades and to secure the propeller as a solid unit.

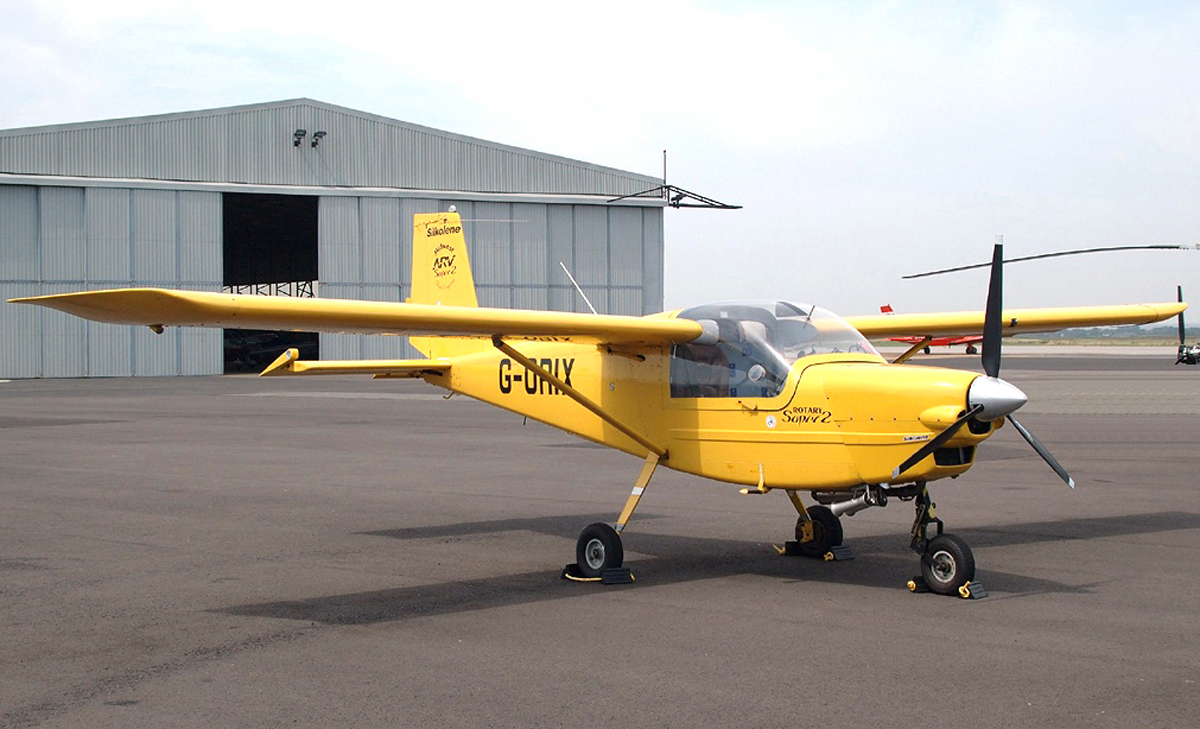
Ground-adjustable Arplast modular propeller on ARV Super2

Modular propellers may be fitted to aircraft as well as boats. The benefits of a modular propeller are that its specifications (such as blade pitch or propeller diameter) may be altered to suit varying conditions; and it becomes much easier to replace damaged elements, such as a broken blade. Traditional one-piece propellers may be professionally modified to change the blade pitch, but this is not a common or easy option. In contrast, a modular propeller allows changes to be made quickly and easily. A modular propeller may have, for instance, a metal hub but composite blades.

One patent application has defined a modular propeller thus:

"A modular propeller comprises a center hub with an integrated front cap and an aluminum core encapsulated with fiber-reinforced composite polymer resin. A set of replaceable blades have bases that slip into and interlock with corresponding slots in the center hub. An elongated rear cap retains the blades in the center hub. The rear cap includes a nozzle section for expelling exhaust gasses that pass through the center parts of the hub and blade bases".
