= Propeller =

Device that transmits rotational power into linear thrust on a fluid

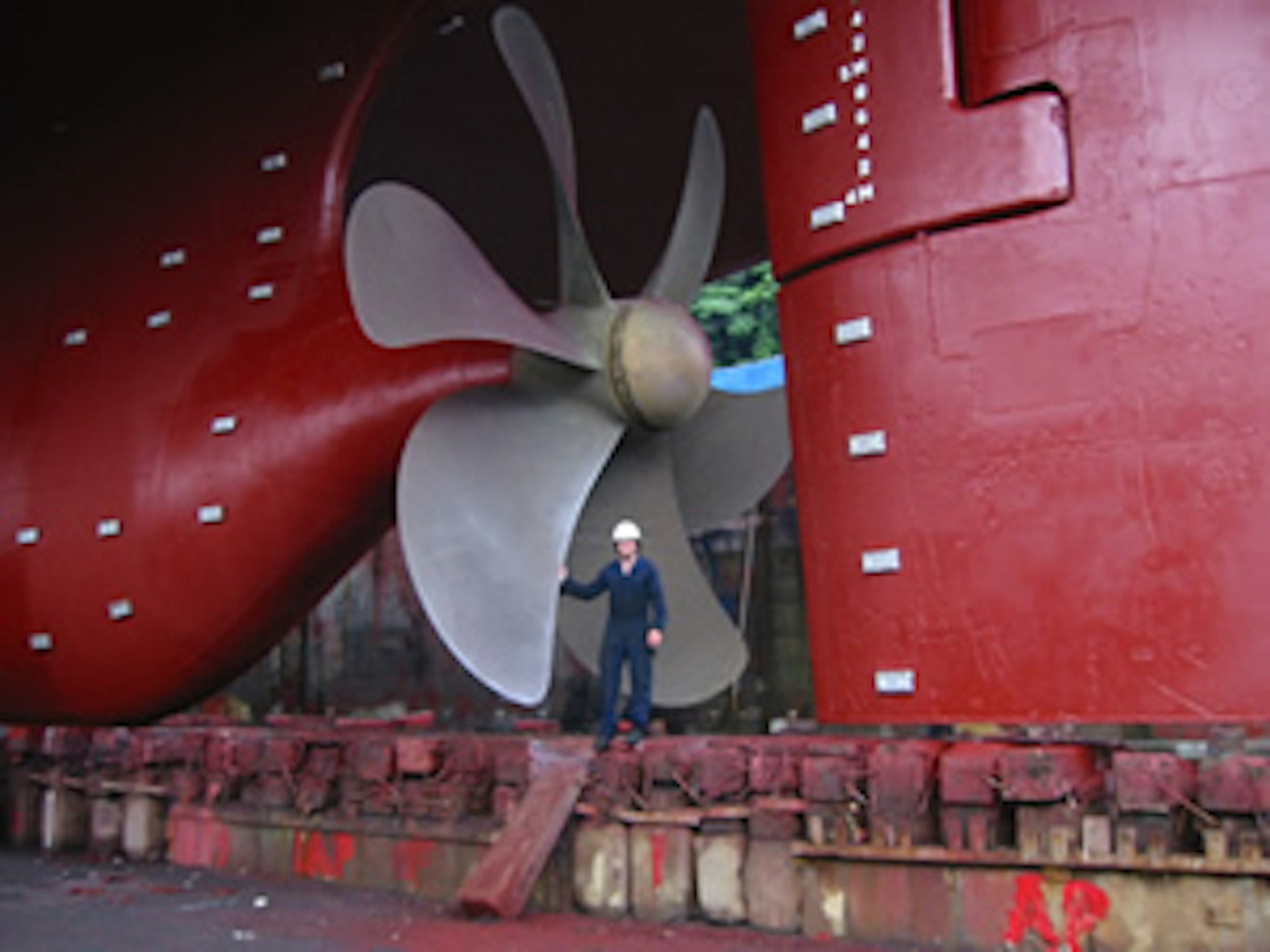
A 'right-handed' propeller on a merchant vessel, which rotates clockwise to propel the ship forward. The man's hand rests on the trailing edge.

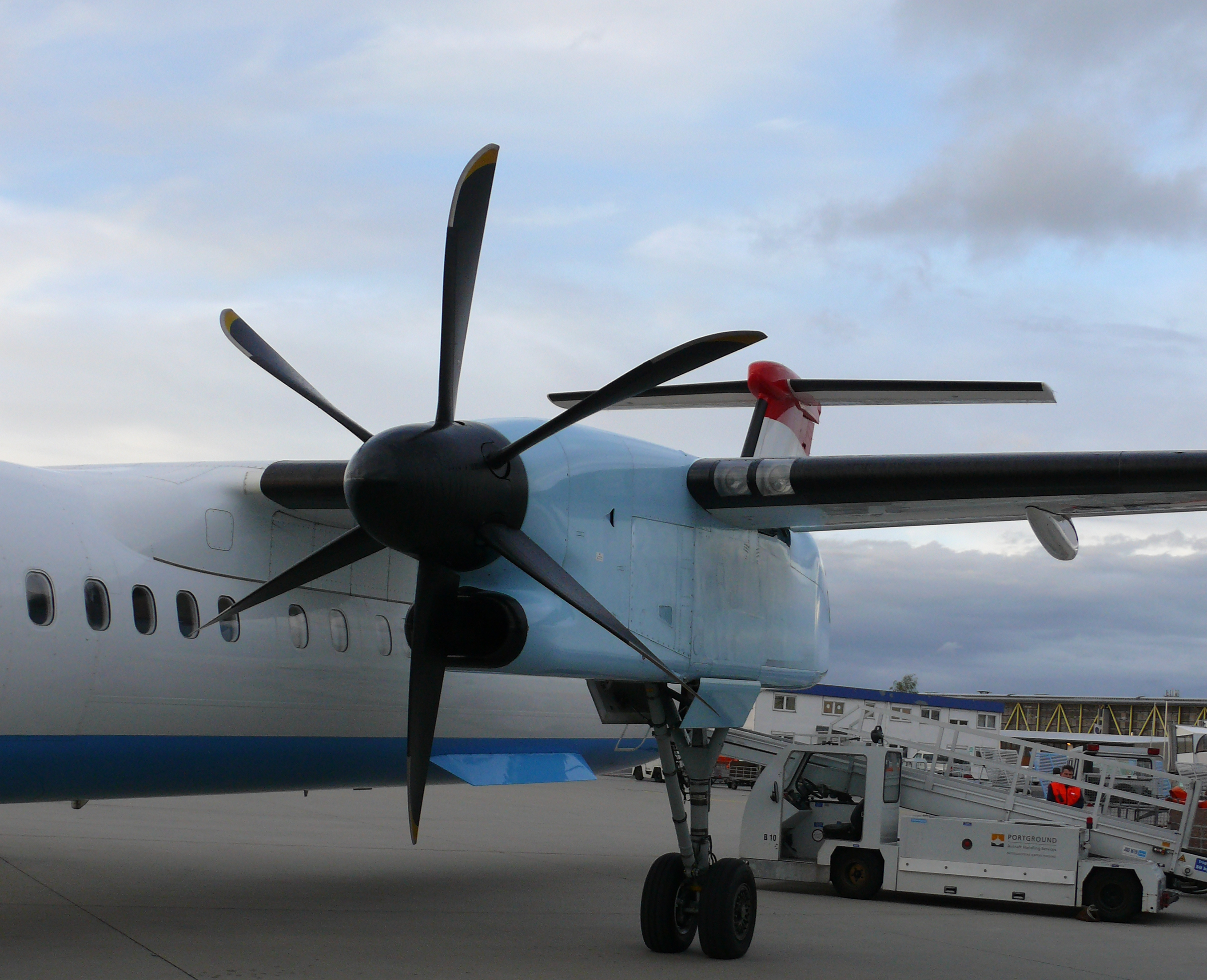
Propeller of Pratt & Whitney Canada PW100 turboprop mounted on Bombardier Q400

A propeller (often called a screw if on a ship or an airscrew if on an aircraft) is a type of propulsor with a rotating hub and radiating blades that are set at a pitch to form a helical spiral which exerts linear thrust upon a working fluid such as water or air when rotated. Propellers are used to pump fluid through a pipe or duct, or to create thrust to propel a boat through water or an aircraft through air.

The blades are shaped so that their rotational motion through the fluid causes a pressure difference between the two surfaces of the blade by Bernoulli's principle which exerts force on the fluid. Most marine propellers are fixed pitch screw propellers with helical blades fixed to a boss, rotating on a propeller shaft with an approximately horizontal axis. (Note: On many boats, the prop shaft is not horizontal but dips towards the stern. Although this is often forced upon the designer by hull shape, it gives a small benefit by helping to counter any squat effect.) Other types of marine propellers include controllable pitch, variable pitch, self pitching, and vertical axis propellers.

== History ==
=== Early developments ===
The principle employed in using a screw propeller is derived from stern sculling. In sculling, a single blade is moved through an arc, from side to side taking care to keep presenting the blade to the water at the effective angle. The innovation introduced with the screw propeller was the extension of that arc through more than 360° by attaching the blade to a rotating shaft. Propellers can have a single blade, but in practice there is nearly always more than one so as to balance the forces involved.

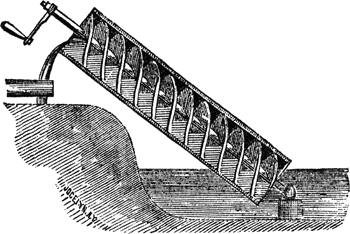
Archimedes' screw

The origin of the screw propeller starts with the first records of a water screw, or screw pump, dates back to Ancient Mesopotamia, a cuneiform inscription of Assyrian King Sennacherib (704–681 BC) describes casting water screws in bronze. This is consistent with classical author Strabo, who describes the Hanging Gardens as watered by screws. Later, Archimedes (c. 287 – c. 212 BC) used a screw to lift water for irrigation and bailing boats, so famously that it became known as Archimedes' screw. It was probably an application of spiral movement in space (spirals were a special study of Archimedes) to a hollow segmented water-wheel used for irrigation by Egyptians for centuries. Later, modern propeller designs usually began with truncating a long screw at the tip.

Additionally, a flying toy, the bamboo-copter, was enjoyed in China beginning around 320 AD.

In 1661, Toogood and Hays proposed using screws for waterjet propulsion, though not as a propeller. Robert Hooke in 1681 designed a horizontal watermill which was remarkably similar to the Kirsten-Boeing vertical axis propeller designed almost two and a half centuries later in 1928; two years later Hooke modified the design to provide motive power for ships through water. In 1693 a Frenchman by the name of Du Quet invented a screw propeller which was tried in 1693 but later abandoned. In 1752, the Academie des Sciences in Paris granted Burnelli a prize for a design of a propeller-wheel. At about the same time, the French mathematician Alexis-Jean-Pierre Paucton suggested a water propulsion system based on the Archimedean screw. In 1771, the steam-engine inventor James Watt in a private letter suggested using "spiral oars" to propel boats, although he did not use them with his steam engines or ever implement the idea.

One of the first practical and applied uses of a propeller was on a submarine dubbed Turtle which was designed in New Haven, Connecticut, in 1775 by David Bushnell, a Yale student and inventor, with the help of Isaac Doolittle, a clock maker, engraver, and brass foundryman of New Haven. Bushnell's brother Ezra Bushnell and Phineas Pratt, a ship's carpenter and clock maker, constructed the hull in Saybrook, Connecticut. On the night of September 6, 1776, Sergeant Ezra Lee piloted Turtle in an attack on HMS Eagle in New York Harbor. Turtle also has the distinction of being the first submarine used in battle. Bushnell later described the propeller in an October 1787 letter to Thomas Jefferson: "An oar formed upon the principle of the screw was fixed in the forepart of the vessel its axis entered the vessel and being turned one way rowed the vessel forward but being turned the other way rowed it backward. It was made to be turned by the hand or foot." The brass propeller, like all the brass and moving parts on Turtle, was crafted by Doolittle.

In 1785, Joseph Bramah of England proposed a propeller solution of a rod going through the underwater aft of a boat attached to a bladed propeller, though he never built it.

In February 1800, Edward Shorter of London proposed using a similar propeller attached to a rod angled down temporarily deployed from the deck above the waterline and thus requiring no water seal, and intended only to assist becalmed sailing vessels. He tested it on the transport ship Doncaster at Gibraltar and Malta, achieving a speed of 1.5 mph (2.4 km/h).

In 1802, the American lawyer and inventor John Stevens built a 25-foot (7.6 m) boat with a rotary steam engine coupled to a four-bladed propeller. The craft achieved a speed of 4 mph (6.4 km/h), but Stevens abandoned propellers because of the inherent danger in using the high-pressure steam engines. His subsequent vessels were paddle-wheeled boats.

By 1827, the Czech inventor Josef Ressel had invented a screw propeller with multiple blades on a conical base. He tested it in February 1826 on a manually-driven ship and successfully used it on a steamboat in 1829. His 48-ton ship Civetta reached 6 knots. This was the first successful Archimedes screw-propelled ship. His experiments were banned by police after a steam engine accident. Ressel, a forestry inspector, held an Austro-Hungarian patent for his propeller. The screw propeller was an improvement over paddlewheels as it wasn't affected by ship motions or draft changes.

John Patch, a mariner in Yarmouth, Nova Scotia, developed a two-bladed, fan-shaped propeller in 1832 and publicly demonstrated it in 1833, propelling a row boat across Yarmouth Harbour and a small coastal schooner at Saint John, New Brunswick, but his patent application in the United States was rejected until 1849 because he was not an American citizen. His efficient design drew praise in American scientific circles but by then he faced multiple competitors.

=== Screw propellers ===
Despite experimentation with screw propulsion before the 1830s, few of these inventions were pursued to the testing stage, and those that were proved unsatisfactory for one reason or another.

Smith's original 1836 patent for a screw propeller of two full turns. He would later revise the patent, reducing the length to one turn.

In 1835, two inventors in Britain, John Ericsson and Francis Pettit Smith, began working separately on the problem. Smith was first to take out a screw propeller patent on 31 May, while Ericsson, a Swedish engineer then working in Britain, filed his patent six weeks later. Smith quickly built a small model boat to test his invention, which was demonstrated first on a pond at his Hendon farm, and later at the Royal Adelaide Gallery of Practical Science in London, where it was seen by the Secretary of the Navy, Sir William Barrow. Having secured the patronage of a London banker named Wright, Smith then built a 30-foot (9.1 m), 6-horsepower (4.5 kW) canal boat of six tons burthen called Francis Smith, which was fitted with his wooden propeller and demonstrated on the Paddington Canal from November 1836 to September 1837. In February 1837, the wooden propeller of two turns was damaged during a voyage, and to Smith's surprise, the broken propeller which now consisted of only a single turn doubled the boat's previous speed from about four miles an hour to eight. Smith would subsequently file a revised patent in keeping with this accidental discovery.

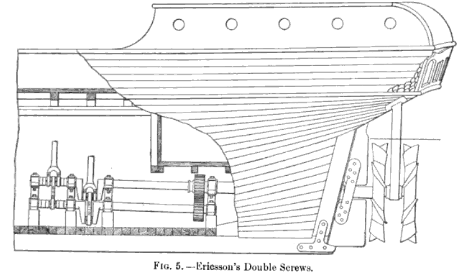
Ericsson's original patent for a contra-rotating screw propulsion.

In the meantime, Ericsson built a 45-foot (14 m) screw-propelled steamboat, Francis B. Ogden in 1837, and demonstrated his boat on the River Thames to senior members of the British Admiralty, including Surveyor of the Navy Sir William Symonds. In spite of the boat's achieving a speed of 10 miles an hour, comparable with that of existing paddle steamers, Symonds and his entourage were unimpressed. The Admiralty maintained that screw propulsion would be ineffective in ocean-going service, while Symonds himself believed that screw propelled ships could not be steered efficiently. (Note: In the case of Francis B. Ogden, Symonds was correct. Ericsson had made the mistake of placing the rudder forward of the propellers, which made the rudder ineffective. Symonds believed that Ericsson tried to disguise the problem by towing a barge during the test.) Following this rejection, Ericsson built a second, larger screw-propelled boat, Robert F. Stockton, and had her sailed in 1839 to the United States, where he was soon to gain fame as the designer of the U.S. Navy's first screw-propelled warship, USS Princeton.

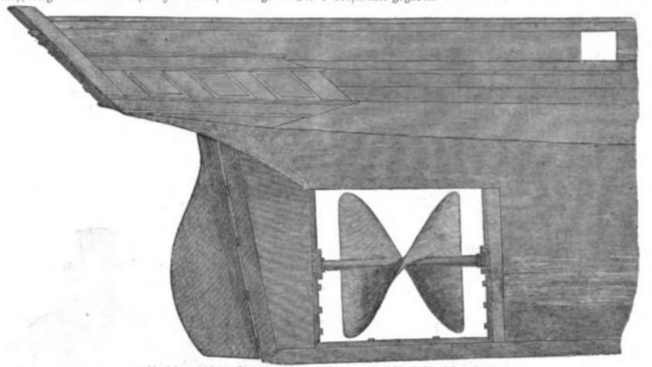
Screw propeller of SS Archimedes

Apparently aware of the Royal Navy's view that screw propellers would prove unsuitable for seagoing service, Smith determined to prove this assumption wrong. In September 1837, he took his small vessel (now fitted with an iron propeller of a single turn) to sea, steaming from Blackwall, London to Hythe, Kent, with stops at Ramsgate, Dover and Folkestone. On the way back to London on the 25th, Smith's craft was observed making headway in stormy seas by officers of the Royal Navy. This revived Admiralty's interest, and Smith was encouraged to build a full-size ship to more conclusively demonstrate the technology.

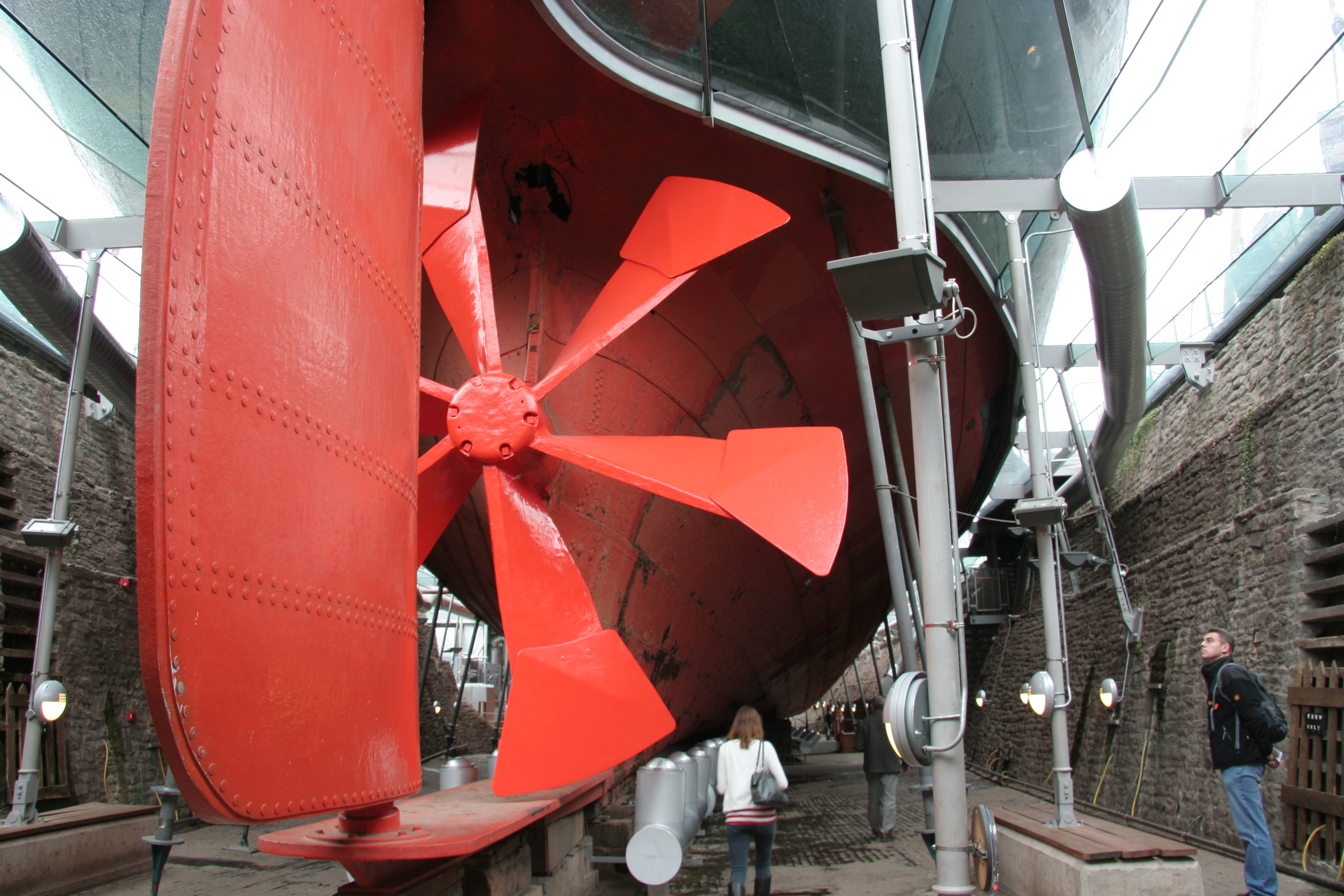
A replica of SS Great Britain's first propeller. A four-bladed model replaced the original in 1845. The ship was originally designed to have paddles, but plans changed after screw propellers were shown to be much more efficient.

SS Archimedes was built in 1838 by Henry Wimshurst of London, as the world's first steamship (Note: The emphasis here is on ship. There were a number of successful propeller-driven vessels prior to Archimedes, including Smith's own Francis Smith and Ericsson's Francis B. Ogden and Robert F. Stockton. However, these vessels were boats – designed for service on inland waterways – as opposed to ships, built for seagoing service.) to be driven by a screw propeller.

The Archimedes had considerable influence on ship development, encouraging the adoption of screw propulsion by the Royal Navy, in addition to her influence on commercial vessels. Trials with Smith's Archimedes led to a tug-of-war competition in 1845 between HMS Rattler and HMS Alecto with the screw-driven Rattler pulling the paddle steamer Alecto backward at 2.5 knots (4.6 km/h).

The Archimedes also influenced the design of Isambard Kingdom Brunel's SS Great Britain in 1843, then the world's largest ship and the first screw-propelled steamship to cross the Atlantic Ocean in August 1845.

HMS Terror and HMS Erebus were both heavily modified to become the first Royal Navy ships to have steam-powered engines and screw propellers. Both participated in Franklin's lost expedition, last seen in July 1845 near Baffin Bay.

Screw propeller design stabilized in the 1880s.

=== Aircraft ===
ATR 72 propeller in flight

The Wright brothers pioneered the twisted aerofoil shape of modern aircraft propellers. They realized an air propeller was similar to a wing. They verified this using wind tunnel experiments. They introduced a twist in their blades to keep the angle of attack constant. Their blades were only 5% less efficient than those used 100 years later. Understanding of low-speed propeller aerodynamics was complete by the 1920s, although increased power and smaller diameters added design constraints.

Alberto Santos Dumont, another early pioneer, applied the knowledge he gained from experiences with airships to make a propeller with a steel shaft and aluminium blades for his 14 bis biplane. Some of his designs used a bent aluminium sheet for blades, thus creating an airfoil shape. They were heavily undercambered, and this plus the absence of lengthwise twist made them less efficient than the Wright propellers. Even so, this may have been the first use of aluminium in the construction of an airscrew.

== Theory ==
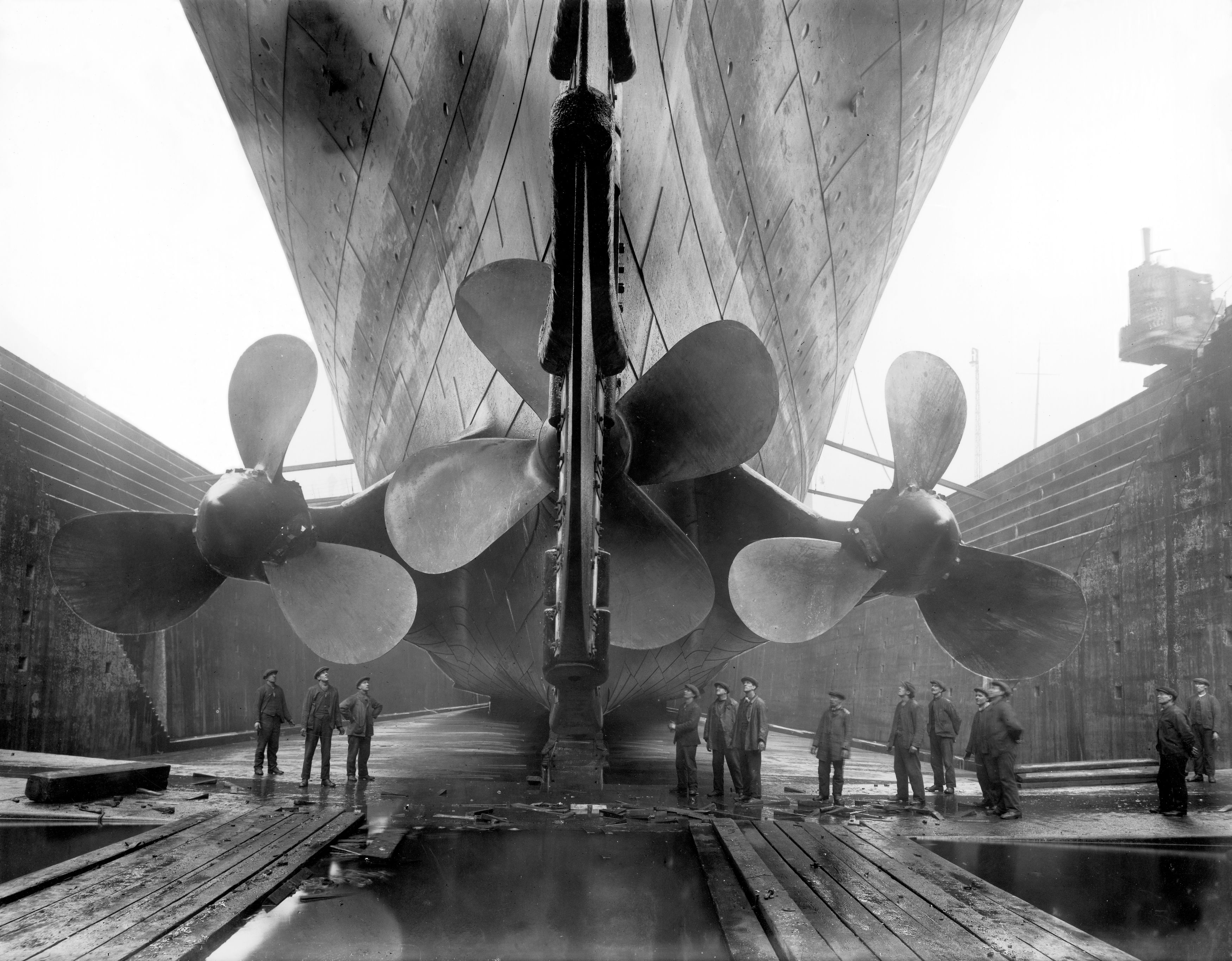
Propellers of RMS Olympic. The outer two are counter-rotating.

In the nineteenth century, several theories concerning propellers were proposed. The momentum theory or disk actuator theory – a theory describing a mathematical model of an ideal propeller – was developed by W.J.M. Rankine (1865), A.G. Greenhill (1888) and R.E. Froude (1889). The propeller is modelled as an infinitely thin disc, inducing a constant velocity along the axis of rotation and creating a flow around the propeller.

A screw turning through a solid will have zero "slip"; but as a propeller screw operates in a fluid (either air or water), there will be some losses. The most efficient propellers are large-diameter, slow-turning screws, such as on large ships; the least efficient are small-diameter and fast-turning (such as on an outboard motor). Using Newton's laws of motion, one may usefully think of a propeller's forward thrust as being a reaction proportionate to the mass of fluid sent backward per time and the speed the propeller adds to that mass, and in practice there is more loss associated with producing a fast jet than with creating a heavier, slower jet. (The same applies in aircraft, in which larger-diameter turbofan engines tend to be more efficient than earlier, smaller-diameter turbofans, and even smaller turbojets, which eject less mass at greater speeds.)

=== Propeller geometry ===
The geometry of a marine screw propeller is based on a helicoidal surface. This may form the face of the blade, or the faces of the blades may be described by offsets from this surface. The back of the blade is described by offsets from the helicoid surface in the same way that an aerofoil may be described by offsets from the chord line. The pitch surface may be a true helicoid or one having a warp to provide a better match of angle of attack to the wake velocity over the blades. A warped helicoid is described by specifying the shape of the radial reference line and the pitch angle in terms of radial distance. The traditional propeller drawing includes four parts: a side elevation, which defines the rake, the variation of blade thickness from root to tip, a longitudinal section through the hub, and a projected outline of a blade onto a longitudinal centreline plane. The expanded blade view shows the section shapes at their various radii, with their pitch faces drawn parallel to the base line, and thickness parallel to the axis. The outline indicated by a line connecting the leading and trailing tips of the sections depicts the expanded blade outline. The pitch diagram shows variation of pitch with radius from root to tip. The transverse view shows the transverse projection of a blade and the developed outline of the blade.

The blades are the foil section plates that develop thrust when the propeller is rotated The hub is the central part of the propeller, which connects the blades together and fixes the propeller to the shaft. This is called the boss in the UK. Rake is the angle of the blade to a radius perpendicular to the shaft. Skew is the tangential offset of the line of maximum thickness to a radius

The propeller characteristics are commonly expressed as dimensionless ratios:

- Pitch ratio PR = propeller pitch/propeller diameter, or P/D
- Disk area A_{0} = πD^{2}/4
- Expanded area ratio = A_{E}/A_{0}, where expanded area A_{E} = Expanded area of all blades outside of the hub.
- Developed area ratio = A_{D}/A_{0}, where developed area A_{D} = Developed area of all blades outside of the hub
- Projected area ratio = A_{P}/A_{0}, where projected area A_{P} = Projected area of all blades outside of the hub
- Mean width ratio = (Area of one blade outside the hub/length of the blade outside the hub)/Diameter
- Blade width ratio = Maximum width of a blade/Diameter
- Blade thickness fraction = Thickness of a blade produced to shaft axis/Diameter

=== Cavitation ===
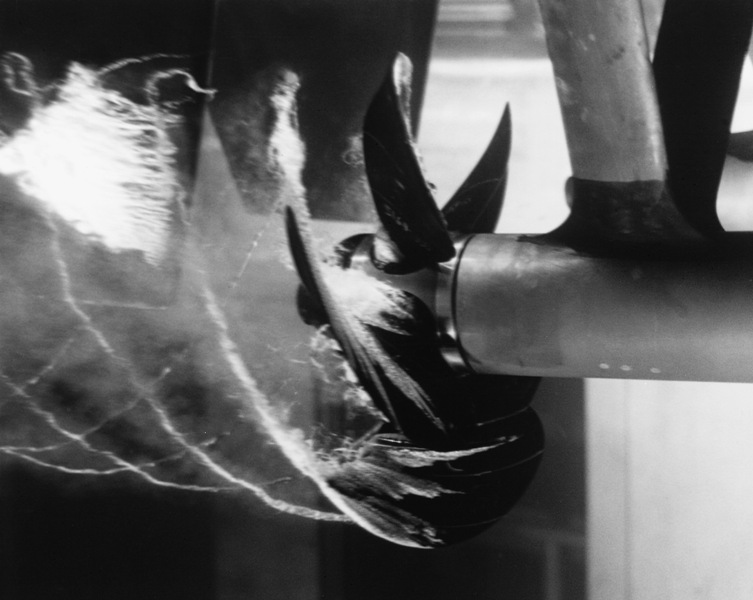
Cavitating propeller in water tunnel experiment

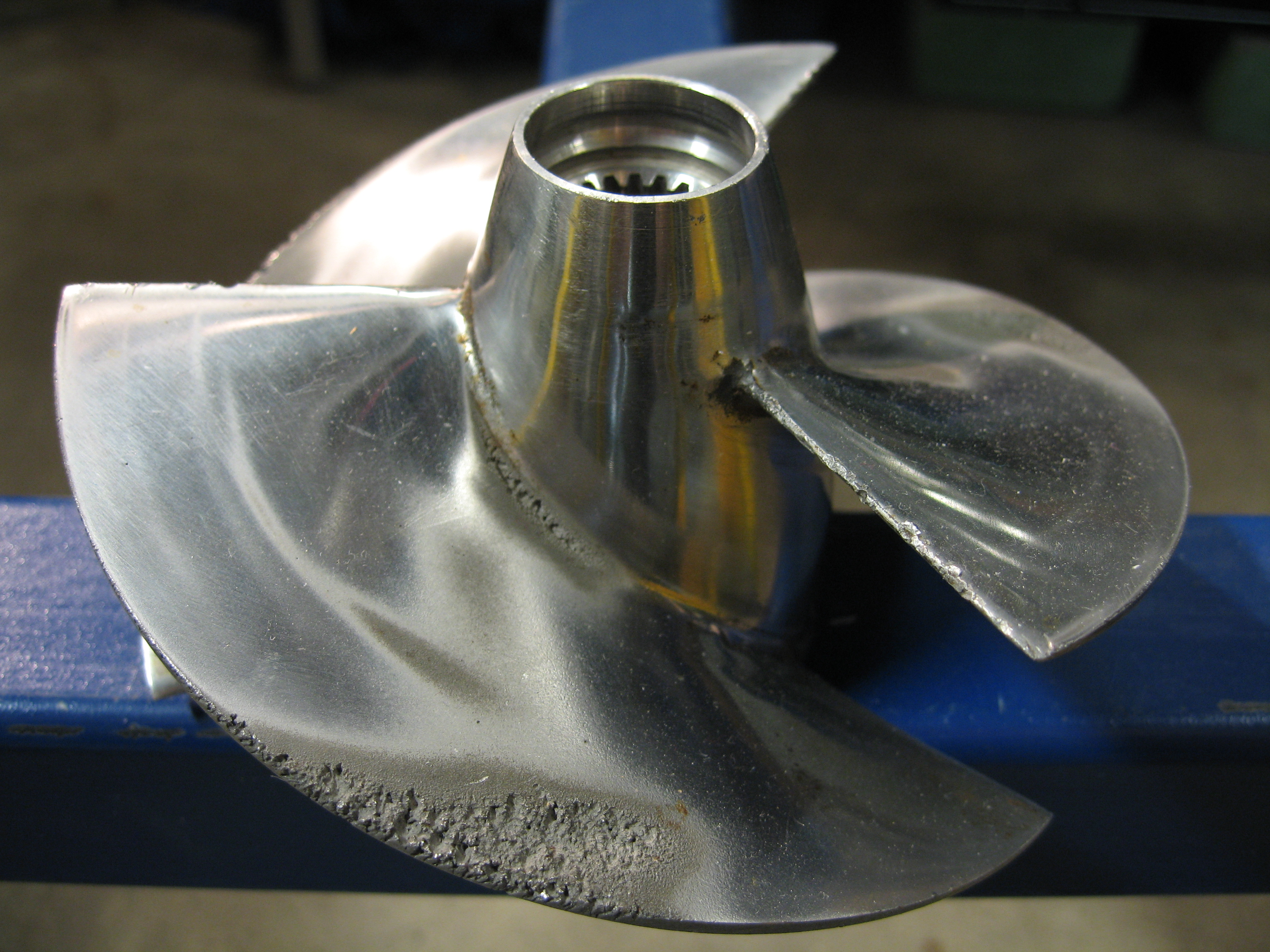
Cavitation damage evident on the propeller of a personal watercraft

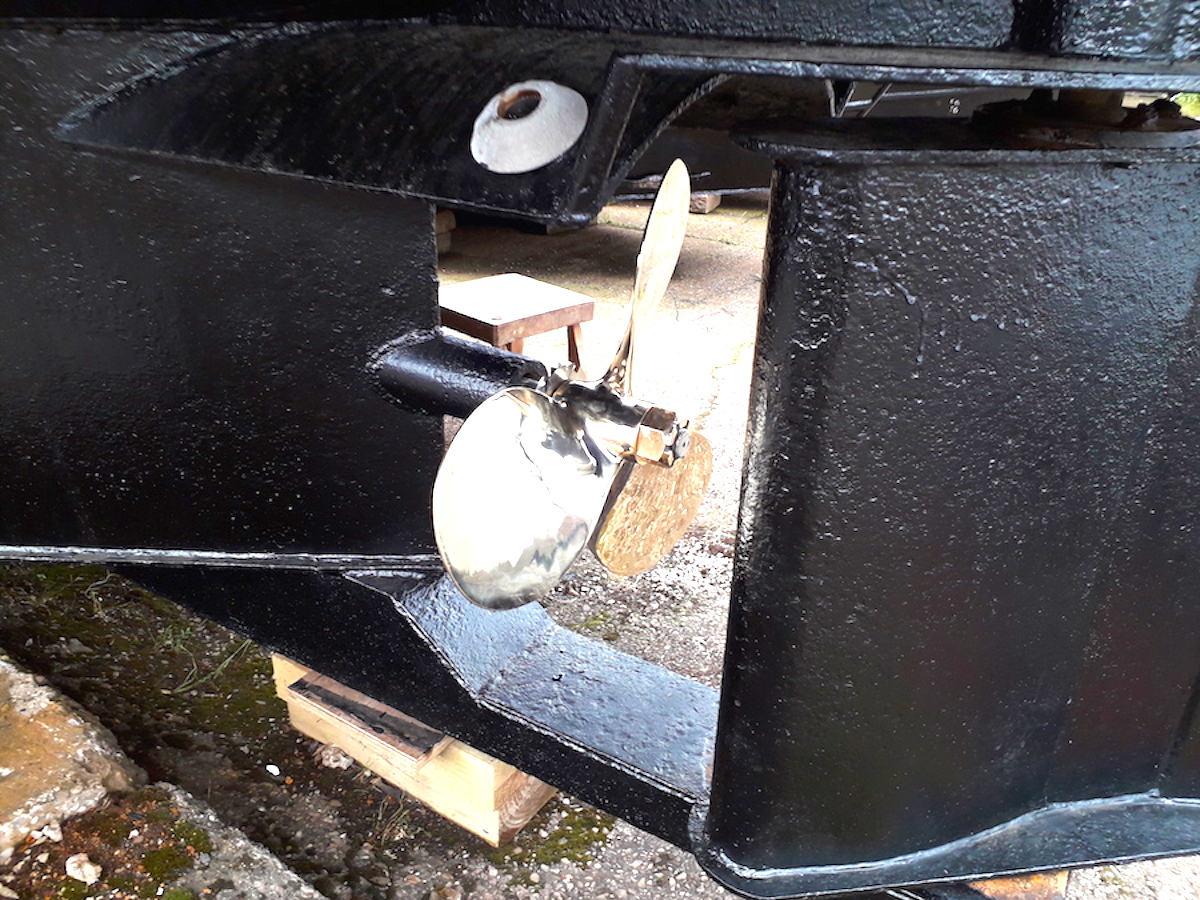
Bronze propeller & anti-cavitation plate, & Schilling rudder (on a river barge)

Cavitation is the formation of vapor bubbles in water near a moving propeller blade in regions of very low pressure. It can occur if an attempt is made to transmit too much power through the screw, or if the propeller is operating at a very high speed. Cavitation can waste power, create vibration and wear, and cause damage to the propeller. It can occur in many ways on a propeller. The two most common types of propeller cavitation are suction side surface cavitation and tip vortex cavitation.

Suction side surface cavitation forms when the propeller is operating at high rotational speeds or under heavy load (high blade lift coefficient). The pressure on the upstream surface of the blade (the "suction side") can drop below the vapor pressure of the water, resulting in the formation of a vapor pocket. Under such conditions, the change in pressure between the downstream surface of the blade (the "pressure side") and the suction side is limited, and eventually reduced as the extent of cavitation is increased. When most of the blade surface is covered by cavitation, the pressure difference between the pressure side and suction side of the blade drops considerably, as does the thrust produced by the propeller. This condition is called "thrust breakdown". Operating the propeller under these conditions wastes energy, generates considerable noise, and as the vapor bubbles collapse it rapidly erodes the screw's surface due to localized shock waves against the blade surface.

Tip vortex cavitation is caused by the extremely low pressures formed at the core of the tip vortex. The tip vortex is caused by fluid wrapping around the tip of the propeller; from the pressure side to the suction side. This video demonstrates tip vortex cavitation. Tip vortex cavitation typically occurs before suction side surface cavitation and is less damaging to the blade, since this type of cavitation doesn't collapse on the blade, but some distance downstream.

== Types of propellers ==
=== Fixed pitch propellers ===
The most common type of propulsor. As demonstrated above, fixed pitch screw propellers were refined during the 19^{th} century into the most effective means of propelling mechanically-powered vessels. Propellers can have any number of blades but three, four and five are the most common in marine applications. Reduced noise designs often have more blades. When considering the handing of propellers, if when viewed from aft a propeller turns clockwise to produce ahead thrust, it is said to be right handed. Conversely, if it turns anti-clockwise to produce ahead thrust it is said to be left handed.

=== Controllable pitch propellers ===
An illustration of a controllable pitch propeller

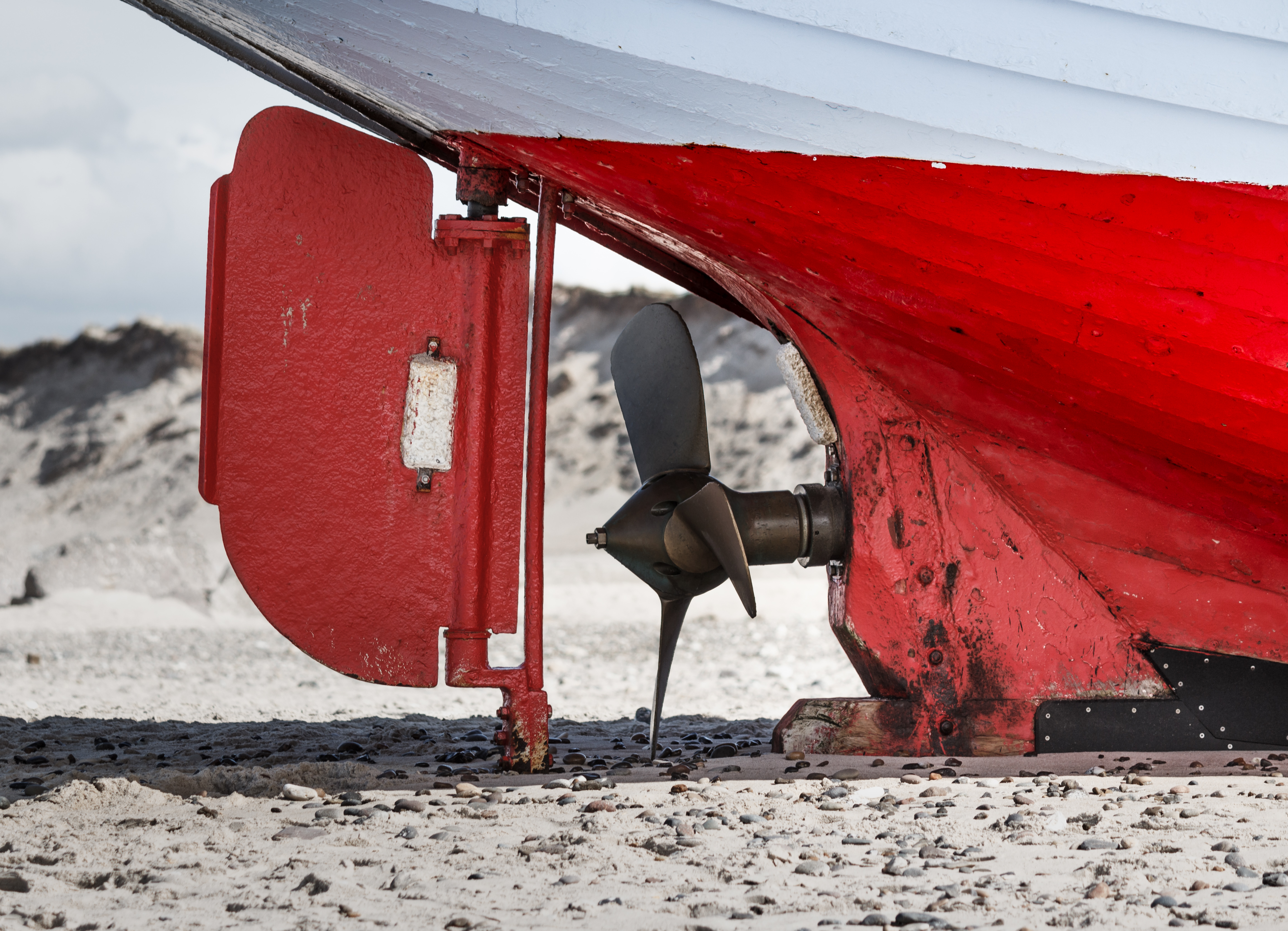
A controllable pitch propeller on a fishing vessel

Controllable pitch propellers (CPP) have blades that can be rotated about axes normal to the vessel's shafting. The pitch can be altered to satisfy a range of conditions and machinery can be run at constant speed so that full power can be developed over the range of operating conditions. CPP can be used to avoid machinery "locking up", a condition where a vessel's machinery is incapable of developing enough torque to turn the propeller at the revolutions appropriate to the power being developed. For a period, this matching was not always possible with fixed blades.

Blades may be actuated mechanically by a system of linkages and connecting rods inside the shafting and boss, hydraulically, or a combination of both. Modern CPP systems provide advantages in responsiveness, efficiency, and eliminate the need for a reversing gearbox or a main engine reversing cam.

=== Variable and self pitching propellers ===
Differing from CPP, in variable pitch propellers the pitch varies with radius but the blades remain fixed. Self pitching propellers have blades that are free to rotate 360° about an axis approximately at right angles to the shafting and are popular in yachting and motorsailing. The angle the blades take up, and therefore their pitch, is dictated by the hydrodynamic and centrifugal forces acting. Variable and self pitching types can provide advantages over the fixed-pitch type, including:

- the ability to select the most effective blade angle for any given speed;
- when motorsailing, the ability to coarsen the blade angle to attain the optimum drive from wind and engines;
- the ability to move astern (in reverse) much more efficiently (fixed props perform very poorly in astern);
- the ability to "feather" the blades to give the least resistance when not in use (for example, when sailing). For large airplanes, if the engine is uncontrollable, the ability to feather the propeller is necessary to prevent the propeller from spinning so fast it breaks apart.

=== Skewback propeller ===
One type of screw used on several nuclear submarine classes, such as the Permit-class, Sturgeon-class, and the Los Angeles-class in the US Navy, as well as the German Type 212 submarine, is called a skewback propeller. As in the scimitar blades used on some aircraft, the blade tips of a skewback propeller are swept back against the direction of rotation. In addition, the blades are tilted rearward along the longitudinal axis, giving the propeller an overall cup-shaped appearance. This design preserves thrust efficiency while reducing cavitation, and thus makes for a quiet, stealthy design. However, skewback screws have, by the 21st century, been largely replaced by pump-jet propulsor units, as pump-jets offer superior stealth characteristics such as lower passive signatures and higher speed before the onset of cavitation, higher manoeuvrability at speed, superior shallow water operative capacity and higher power density.

A small number of ships use propellers with winglets similar to those on some airplane wings, reducing tip vortices and improving efficiency.

=== Modular propeller ===
A modular propeller provides more control over the boat's performance. There is no need to change an entire propeller when there is an opportunity to only change the pitch or the damaged blades. Being able to adjust pitch will allow for boaters to have better performance while in different altitudes, water sports, or cruising.

=== Vertical axis (Voith Schneider) propeller ===
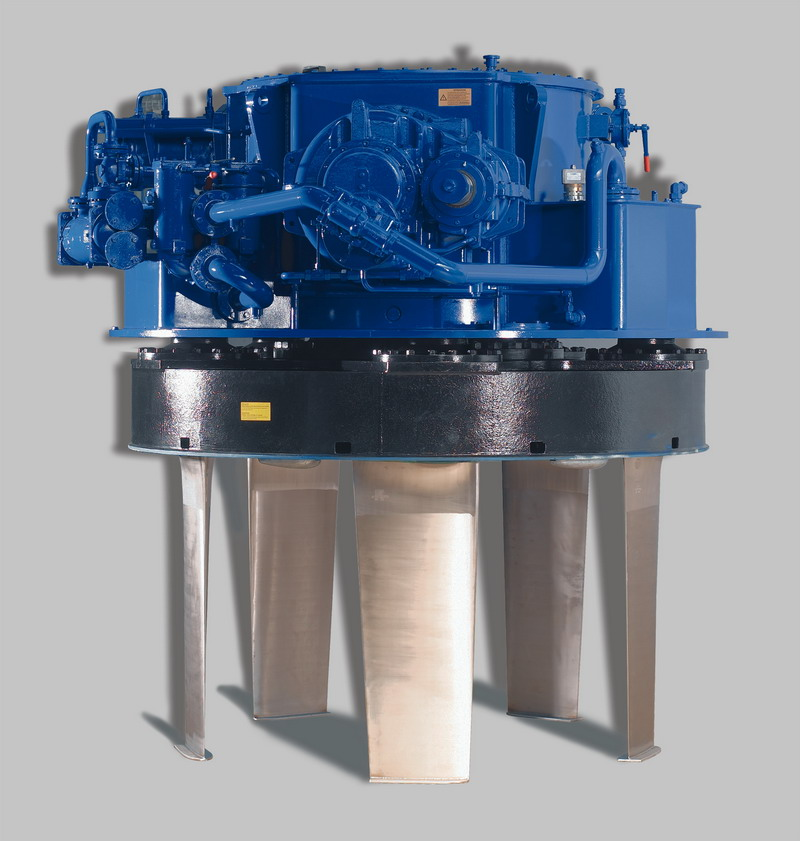
Voith Schneider Propeller

The Voith Schneider Propeller (VSP) is a specialized marine propulsion system (MPS) manufactured by the Voith Group based on a cyclorotor design. It is highly maneuverable, being able to change the direction of its thrust almost instantaneously. It is widely used on tugs and ferries. The Voith Schneider drive was invented by Ernst Schneider. It has been developed and produced by Voith in Heidenheim an der Brenz and St. Pölten since 1926.

=== Shaftless ===
A rim-driven thruster integrates an electric motor into a ducted propeller. The cylindrical duct acts as the stator, while the tips of the blades act as the rotor. They typically provide high torque and operate at low RPMs, producing less noise. The system does not require a shaft, reducing weight. Units can be placed at various locations around the hull and operated independently, e.g., to aid in maneuvering. The absence of a shaft allows alternative rear hull designs.

=== Toroidal ===
Twisted-toroid (ring-shaped) propellers, first invented over 120 years ago, replace the blades with a-circular rings. They are significantly quieter (particularly at audible frequencies) and more efficient than traditional propellers for both air and water applications. The design distributes vortices generated by the propeller across the entire shape, causing them to dissipate faster in the atmosphere.

== Damage protection ==
=== Shaft protection ===
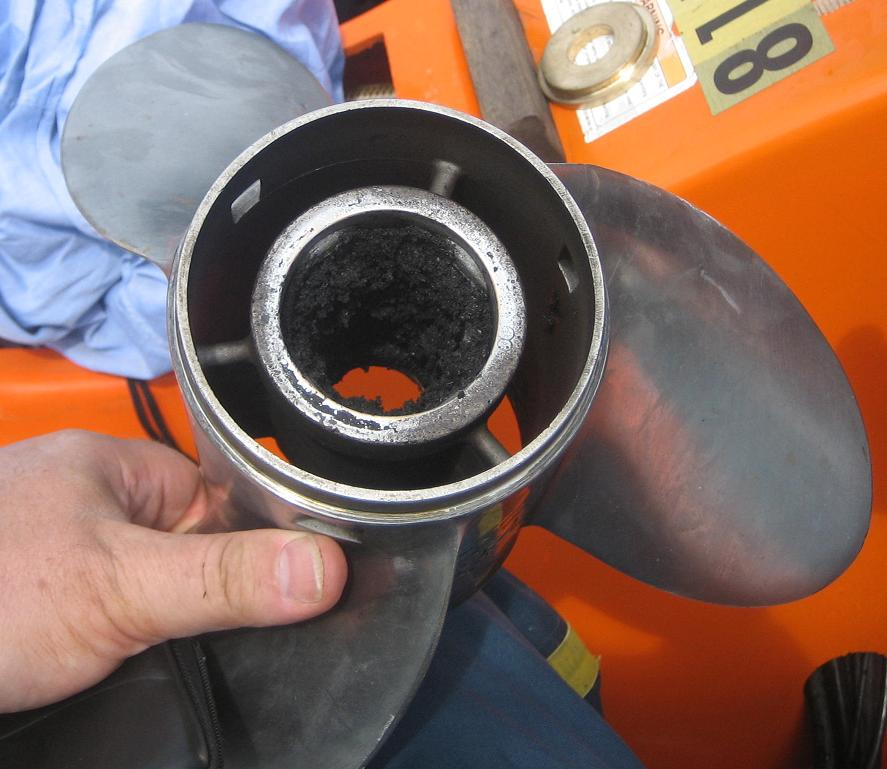
A failed rubber bushing in an outboard's propeller

For smaller engines, such as outboards, where the propeller is exposed to the risk of collision with heavy objects, the propeller often includes a device that is designed to fail when overloaded; the device or the whole propeller is sacrificed so that the more expensive transmission and engine are not damaged.

Typically in smaller (less than 10 hp or 7.5 kW) and older engines, a narrow shear pin through the drive shaft and propeller hub transmits the power of the engine at normal loads. The pin is designed to shear when the propeller is put under a load that could damage the engine. After the pin is sheared the engine is unable to provide propulsive power to the boat until a new shear pin is fitted.

In larger and more modern engines, a rubber bushing transmits the torque of the drive shaft to the propeller's hub. Under a damaging load the friction of the bushing in the hub is overcome and the rotating propeller slips on the shaft, preventing overloading of the engine's components. After such an event the rubber bushing may be damaged. If so, it may continue to transmit reduced power at low revolutions, but may provide no power, due to reduced friction, at high revolutions. Also, the rubber bushing may perish over time leading to its failure under loads below its designed failure load.

In some modern propellers, a hard polymer insert called a drive sleeve replaces the rubber bushing. The splined or other non-circular cross section of the sleeve inserted between the shaft and propeller hub transmits the engine torque to the propeller, rather than friction. The polymer is weaker than the components of the propeller and engine so it fails before they do when the propeller is overloaded. This fails completely under excessive load, but can easily be replaced.

=== Weed hatches and rope cutters ===
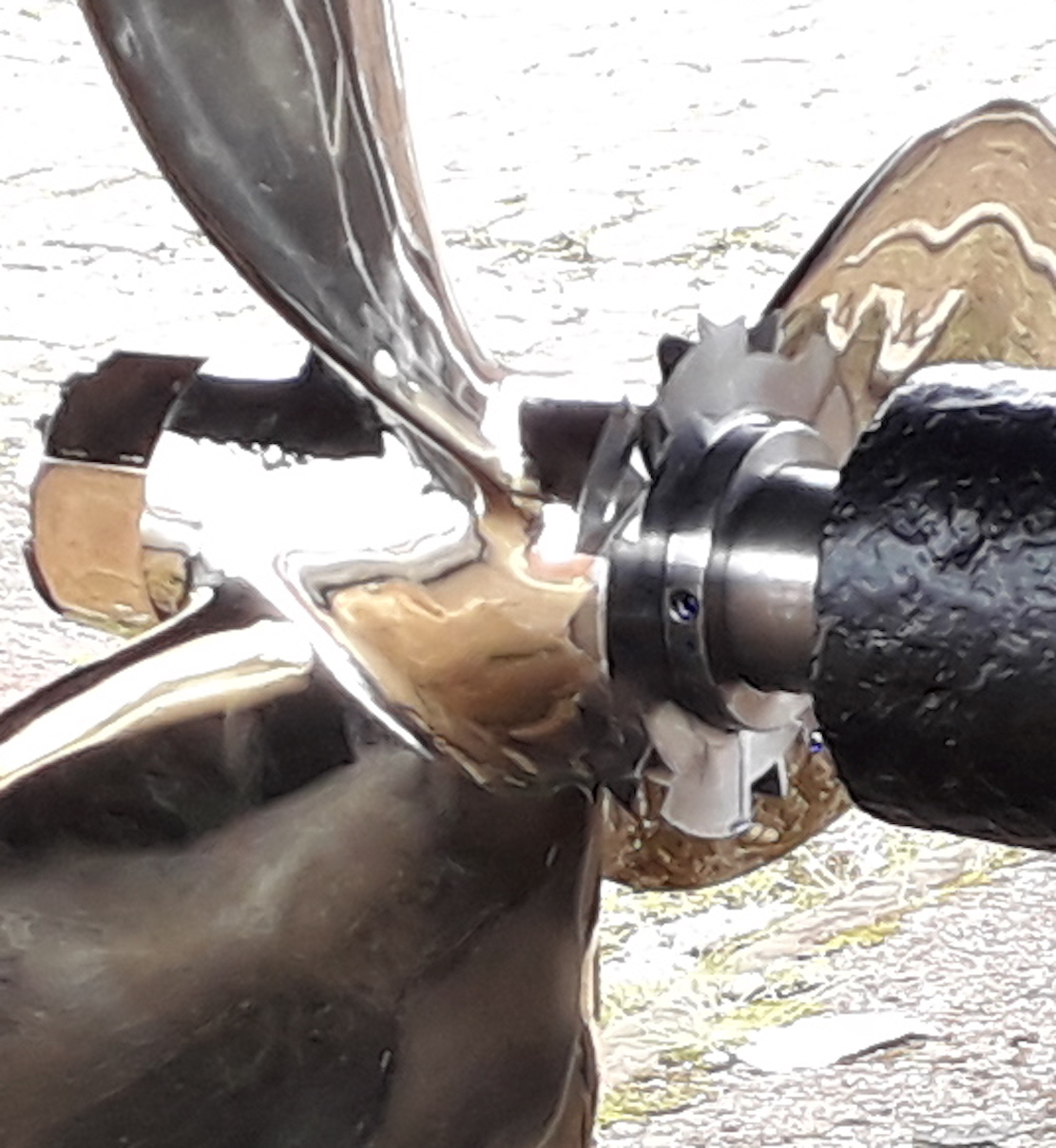
Bronze propeller & stainless steel rope cutter

Whereas the propeller on a large ship will be immersed in deep water and free of obstacles and flotsam, yachts, barges and river boats often suffer propeller fouling by debris such as weed, ropes, cables, nets and plastics. British narrowboats invariably have a weed hatch over the propeller, and once the narrowboat is stationary, the hatch may be opened to give access to the propeller, enabling debris to be cleared. Yachts and river boats rarely have weed hatches; instead they may fit a rope cutter that fits around the prop shaft and rotates with the propeller. These cutters clear the debris and obviate the need for divers to attend manually to the fouling. Several forms of rope cutters are available:

1. A simple sharp edged disc that cuts like a razor;
2. A rotor with two or more projecting blades that slice against a fixed blade, cutting with a scissor action;
3. A serrated rotor with a complex cutting edge made up of sharp edges and projections.

== Propeller variations ==
A cleaver is a type of propeller design especially used for boat racing. Its leading edge is formed round, while the trailing edge is cut straight. It provides little bow lift, so that it can be used on boats that do not need much bow lift, for instance hydroplanes, that naturally have enough hydrodynamic bow lift. To compensate for the lack of bow lift, a hydrofoil may be installed on the lower unit. Hydrofoils reduce bow lift and help to get a boat out of the hole and onto plane.

== See also ==
- Screw-propelled vehicle – Vehicle propelled by load-bearing rotating helical flanges

=== Propeller characteristics ===
- Advance ratio – Ratio of freestream speed to tip speed
- Axial fan design – Fan that induces gas flow mostly parallel to the shaft

=== Propeller phenomena ===
- Propeller walk – Tendency of a propeller to yaw a vessel during acceleration
- Cavitation – Low-pressure voids formed in liquids

=== Other ===
- Azimuth thruster – Steerable propulsion pod under a watercraft
  - Azipod – Electric drive azimuth thruster
- Bow thruster – Transverse or steerable propulsion device at the bow of a watercraft
- Ducted propeller – Marine propeller with a non-rotating nozzle
  - Pump-jet – Marine propulsion system
- Folding propeller – Propeller with blades that fold open
- Helix – Space curve that winds around a line
- Impeller – Rotor that increases fluid pressure and flow
- Kitchen rudder – Type of directional propulsion system for vessels
- Maneuvering thruster – Transverse or steerable propulsion device in a watercraft
- Modular propeller – Propeller assembled from components
- Paddle steamer – Steam-powered vessel propelled by paddle wheels
- Pleuger rudder – Thruster assisted ship's rudder
- Propulsor – Mechanical device to propel a vessel
- Stern thruster – Transverse or steerable propulsion device at the stern of a watercraft
- Supercavitating propeller – Marine propeller designed to operate with a full cavitation bubble
- Variable-pitch propeller – Propeller with blades that can be rotated to control their pitch while in use
- Voith-Schneider propeller – Perpendicular-axis marine propulsion system
- Wake-equalising duct – Ship hull appendage to modify propeller inflow

=== Materials and manufacture ===
External videos
- Construction of Wooden Propellers 1 2 3, NASA Langley

- Balancing machine – Measuring tool used for balancing rotating machine parts
- Composite material – Material made from a combination of two or more unlike substances
