= Linear (disambiguation) =

Linearity is a property of various things in mathematics, physics, and electronics.

Linear, linearly, or linearity may also refer to:

== Mathematics ==
- Linear approximation table (LAT; also known as correlation matrix), the set of Walsh transforms of linear functions of output bits of a vectorial Boolean function
- Linear assignment problem, a combinatorial optimization problem about assigning agents to tasks while minimizing total cost, when that is the sum of the costs for each agent
- Linear bounded automaton (LBA), a Turing machine with the tape size limited to just its input plus endmarkers
- Linear combination (AKA superposition), an expression constructed from a set of terms by multiplying each term by a constant and adding the results
- Linear congruential generator (LCG), algorithm that yields a sequence of pseudo-randomized numbers calculated with a discontinuous piecewise linear equation
- Linear convergence (to converge linearly), the description of a sequence approaching a limit with convergence order q = 1 and rate μ ∈ (0, 1)
- Linear function, a function that has some kind of linearity
- Linear–log (AKA lin–log) plot, a graph with a linear scale on the Y-axis and a log scale on the X-axis
- Linear logic, a substructural logic that joins the dualities of classical logic with many of the constructive properties of intuitionistic logic
- Linear programming (LP; also known as linear optimization), a method to achieve the best outcome in a mathematical model whose requirements and objective are represented by linear relationships
- Linear recurrence sequence (AKA constant-recursive, linear-recursive, linear-recurrent, C-finite sequence), an infinite list of values that each satisfy a linear equation of a constant number of previous terms
- Linear recurrence with constant coefficients (AKA linear recurrence relation, linear difference equation), an equation that sets equal to 0 a polynomial that is linear in the various iterates of a variable
- Linear SAT (LSAT), a Boolean/propositional satisfiability problem with a 3-SAT formula where each clause's set of literals intersects at most one other's, with exactly one literal in common
- Linear sequence (AKA arithmetic progression, arithmetic sequence), a list of numbers where the difference between consecutive terms remains constant throughout
- Linear spline, a function defined piecewise by polynomials of degree (at most) 1
- Linear term, a component of a formula that contains at most one occurrence of each variable

=== Abstract algebra and order theory ===
- (Linear) continuum, a generalization of the real number line
- Linear disjointness (being linearly disjoint), a property of algebras over a field inside a field extension
- Linear extension, a total order that is compatible with some given partial order
- Linearly ordered group (AKA totally ordered group), a group with a total order that is translation-invariant
- Linear order (AKA total order), a binary relation that is not just a partial order but ensures that any two elements are comparable
- Linear topology, something required for a module to be linearly topologized

=== Calculus ===
- Linear differential equation, an equality relation between a constant term and the sum of derivatives of a function multiplied by constant coefficients
- Linear differential operator, a kind of operator defined as a function of the differentiation operator
- Linearity of differentiation, a property of derivatives in calculus
- Linearity of integration, a property of integrals in calculus
- Linear partial differential equation, an equation which involves a multivariable function and one or more of its partial derivatives, when it is linear in the unknown and its derivatives, or (equivalently?), if it is homogeneous, the sum of any two solutions is also a solution, and any constant multiple of any solution is also a solution

=== Cryptography and information theory ===
- Linear code, an error-correcting code for which any linear combination of codewords is also a codeword
- Linear cryptanalysis, a method of breaking a cipher based on finding affine approximations
- Linear diffusion, the property of a cipher that ensures that a single bit of plaintext results in half of the bits in the ciphertext changing and vice-versa, using a transformation such as multiplication by a matrix over a finite field
- Linear keyspace (AKA flat key space), the property of a cipher with no weak keys

=== Geometry ===
- Linear dimension, a 1D subspace in physical space
- Linear eccentricity (usually denoted c, e, or f), the distance between the center and either focus of an ellipse or hyperbola
- Linear equivalence, a concept related to divisors in algebraic geometry
- Linear fractional transformation, an (invertible) homography based on a ratio of linear polynomials
- Linearly normal (AKA 1-normal), a property in algebraic geometry related to homogeneous coordinate rings
- Linearly unique polytope (AKA linearly stable polytope), a centrally symmetric partially ordered set with a unique origin symmetric realization up to linear transformations
- Linear pair of angles, two adjacent angles where their non-shared sides form a straight line, and as such are supplementary
- Linear separability, the property of two sets of points, where they are linearly separable if there exists at least one line or hyperplane that divides the space such that one set is contained within one side, and the other set within the other side

=== Linear algebra (including functional analysis) ===
Linear algebra, the branch of mathematics that studies linear equations, linear maps, vector spaces, and matrices

→ Outline of linear algebra

Linear equation, an equality relation that only involves variables multiplied by numeric coefficients, added up along with a constant term

Linear map (AKA linear mapping, linear operator, linear transformation), a function between vector spaces, which preserves the operations of vector addition and scalar multiplication, through the properties of additivity and homogeneity, respectively

- General linear group, a set of invertible same-size square matrices with the operation of matrix multiplication
- Honors Advanced Calculus and Linear Algebra, the previous official title of the course Math 55 at Harvard University
- Linear algebraic group, a subgroup of the group of invertible same-size square matrices under matrix multiplication that is defined by polynomial equations
- Linear Diophantine equation, a linear equation limited to integer coefficients and solutions
- Linear form (AKA linear functional, one-form, covector), a linear map from a vector space to its field of scalars
- Linear group, a set with an operation that is isomorphic to the matrix group, of invertible matrices over a specified field with the operation of matrix multiplication
- Linear hull, AKA linear span
- Linear independence (being linearly independent), the property of a set of vectors where none is a linear combination of the others
- Linear isometry, a linear map between normed vector spaces that preserves the norms
- Linear space (AKA vector space), a set whose elements (vectors), can be added together and multiplied by numbers (scalars)
- Linear span (AKA linear hull, span), the smallest linear subspace of a vector space that includes a set of elements
- Linear subspace (AKA vector subspace), a vector space that is a subset of some larger vector space
- Linear topological space (AKA topological vector space, TVS, t.v.s.), a vector space that is also a topological space with the property that the vector space operations (vector addition and scalar multiplication) are also continuous functions
- Linear variety or linear manifold (AKA flat, affine subspace), a subset of an affine space that is itself an affine space
- Numerical linear algebra (AKA applied linear algebra), the study of how matrix operations can be used to create computer algorithms which efficiently and accurately provide approximate answers to questions in continuous mathematics
- Projective linear group (AKA projective general linear group, PGL), the induced action of the general linear group of a vector space on the associated projective space
- Special linear group, the set of same-size square matrices with determinant 1, with the group operations of matrix multiplication and matrix inversion
- System of linear equations (AKA linear system), a collection of equalities relating a set of variables

=== Statistics and machine learning ===
- Bayesian linear regression, a type of conditional modeling in which the mean of one variable is described by a linear combination of other variables, with the goal of obtaining posterior probabilities and an out-of-sample prediction of the regressand
- Best linear unbiased prediction/predictor (BLUP), used in linear mixed models for the estimation of random effects
- Constrained linear inversion (AKA linear regularization, ridge regression, Tikhonov regularization), a method of estimating the coefficients of multiple-regression models in scenarios where the variables are highly correlated
- General linear model (AKA general multivariate regression model), a compact way of simultaneously writing several multiple linear regression models using matrices
- Generalized linear model (GLM), a flexible generalization of ordinary linear regression that allows the linear model to be related to the response variable via a link function and allows the magnitude of the variance of each measurement to be a function of its predicted value
- Hierarchical linear model (AKA multilevel model), a statistical model of parameters that vary at more than one level, that is a generalization of linear models
- Linear classifier, a decision algorithm with linear boundaries, i.e. that makes a classification decision for each object based on a linear combination of its features
- Linear correlation, a statistical relationship between two random variables or bivariate data, describing the extent to which a pair of quantities are linearly related
- Linear discriminant analysis (LDA; also known as normal discriminant analysis, NDA, canonical variates analysis, CVA, discriminant function analysis), a method to find a linear combination of features that characterizes or separates two or more classes of objects or events
- Linear extrapolation, estimating the value of one variable based on another, beyond the original observation range, by using a line or linear function
- Linear interpolation (lerp), a method of curve fitting using linear polynomials to construct new data points within the range of a set of known points
- Linear least squares, the least squares approximation of linear functions to data
- Linear mixed-effects model (AKA linear mixed model, LMM), a kind of statistical model containing both fixed effects and random effects
- Linear prediction, a mathematical operation where future values of a discrete-time signal are estimated as a linear function of previous samples
- Linear predictive analysis, a simple form of first-order extrapolation that assumes an approximately constant rate of change in the short term, equivalent to fitting a tangent to the graph and extending the line
- Linear predictor function, a linear function (linear combination) of a set of coefficients and explanatory variables (independent variables), whose value is used to predict the outcome of a dependent variable
- Linear regression, a statistical model that uses a linear function to approximately fit a set of data points
- Linear trend estimation, a statistical technique used to analyze data patterns
- Linearity of expectation, a property of the expected value operator
- Locally linear embedding (LLE), a technique to embed each point in a data set to some much-lower-dimensional point, involving approximate reconstruction by a linear combination
- Rectified linear unit (ReLU, also known as the rectifier), an activation function defined as the non-negative part of its argument, i.e., the ramp function
- Simple linear regression (SLR), a linear regression model for two-dimensional sample points, having one independent/explanatory variable and one dependent variable

== Science ==
- Exponential–Linear model (AKA Thalmann Algorithm, VVAL 18), a deterministic algorithm designed in 1980 to produce a decompression schedule for divers using the US Navy Mk15 rebreather
- Lincoln Near-Earth Asteroid Research (LINEAR), a collaboration of the United States Air Force, NASA, and the Massachusetts Institute of Technology's Lincoln Laboratory for the systematic detection and tracking of near-Earth objects, with instruments located at Lincoln Laboratory's Experimental Test Site (ETS) on the White Sands Missile Range (WSMR) near Socorro, New Mexico
  - List of comets discovered by the LINEAR project
- Linear acceleration, change in speed, when the direction of velocity remains constant
- Linear astrolabe (AKA staff of al-Tusi), a kind of astronomical instrument that serves as a star chart and physical model of the visible half-dome of the sky, using a wooden rod, plumb line, double chord, and perforated pointer, invented in the 12th century by Sharaf al-Dīn al-Tūsī
- (Linear) attenuation coefficient (AKA narrow-beam attenuation coefficient), a measure of how easily a volume of material can be penetrated by a beam of energy or matter
- Linear charge density (λ), the amount of electric charge per unit length
- Linear drag (AKA viscous resistance), a kind of force acting opposite to the direction of motion of any object moving with respect to a surrounding fluid
- Linear elasticity, a simplified mathematical model of how solid objects deform and become internally stressed by prescribed loading conditions
- Linear energy transfer (LET), the amount of energy that an ionizing particle transfers to the material traversed per unit distance
- Linear number density, an intensive quantity describing the degree of concentration of countable objects along one dimension of physical space
- Linear optics, the sub-field for linear systems of the branch of physics that studies the behaviour, manipulation, and detection of electromagnetic radiation
- Linear polarization (French: polarisation rectiligne; AKA plane polarization), a confinement of the electric or magnetic field vector to a given plane (or equivalently, a perpendicular direction) along the direction of propagation
- Linear inverse problem, the process of calculating from a set of observations the causal factors that produced them, using a linear forward map
- Linearity principle (AKA superposition principle, superposition property), that the net response caused by two or more stimuli is the sum of the responses that would have been caused by each stimulus individually
- Linear momentum (AKA translational momentum or just momenum), mass times velocity
- Linear motion (AKA rectilinear motion), one-dimensional movement along a straight line, i.e. in a constant direction
- Linear thermal expansion, a ratio measuring the tendency of matter to increase in size by decreasing in density
- Linear wave theory (AKA Airy wave theory), a linearised description of the propagation of gravity waves on the surface of a homogeneous fluid layer

=== Biology, medicine, and other life sciences ===
- Linear chromosome, a package of DNA that is linear in shape and contains terminal ends
- Linear epitope (AKA sequential epitope), a binding site on an antigen that is recognized by antibodies by its linear sequence of amino acids (i.e. primary structure)
- Linear foreign body, an object within an organism that came from outside, when it is a length of string with a larger object or clump at one end, or similar
- Linear fracture, a break in a bone that is parallel to its long axis
- Linear gingival erythema (LGE; previously termed HIV-associated gingivitis), a periodontal condition characterised by a distinct 2 to 3mm band of erythema along the free gingival margin
- Linear IgM dermatosis of pregnancy (AKA prurigo gestationis), an eruption consisting of pruritic, excoriated papules of the proximal limbs and upper trunk
- Linear leaf (Latin: folium lineare, linearis), a principal appendage of the stem of a vascular plant, when its shape is long and very narrow like a blade of grass
- Linear lichen planus, a subtype of the chronic inflammatory and autoimmune disease LP, when the papules are arranged in a line (the "Blaschko line")
- Linear no-threshold model, a dose-response model used in ionizing radiation protection to estimate stochastic health effects
- Linear plasmid, a small, extrachromosomal DNA molecule within a cell that is physically separated from chromosomal DNA and can replicate independently, when its structure has free ends rather than being circular
- Linear scleroderma, an autoimmune disease characterized by a line of thickened skin which can affect the bones and muscles underneath it
- Linear skull fracture, a break in bone that transverses the full thickness of the skull from the outer to inner table

=== Chemistry ===
- Linear alkane (AKA straight-chain alkane, linear paraffin, n-paraffin), an acyclic saturated hydrocarbon molecule, where all of the carbon atoms form a single chain rather than having branches
- Linear alkylbenzene sulfonate (LAS), an anionic surfactant consisting of a hydrophilic sulfonate head-group and a hydrophobic alkylbenzene tail-group, where the starting alkenes are linear
- Linear combination of atomic orbitals (LCAO), a quantum superposition of atomic orbitals and a technique for calculating molecular orbitals
- Linear dislocation, a kind of crystallographic defect or irregularity within a crystal structure that contains an abrupt change in the arrangement of atoms
- Linear free energy relationship (LFER), a linear relationship between the Gibbs free energy changes of two series of chemical reactions
- Linear furanocoumarin/furocoumarin, a kind of organic chemical compound with a linear chemical structure
- Linear low-density polyethylene (LLDPE), a substantially linear polymer, with significant numbers of short branches
- Linear molecular geometry, when a central atom bonded to two other atoms (or ligands) placed at a bond angle of 180°
- Linear polyacrylamide (LPA), a kind of polymer with formula (-CH_{2}CHCONH_{2}-)
- Linear polymer, a substance or material that consists of very large molecules, where the structure is periodic and has low branching and stereoregularity

== Technology ==
- Free-piston linear generator (FPLG), a device that uses chemical energy from fuel to drive magnets through a stator and converts this linear motion into electric energy
- Phase Linear, an audio equipment manufacturer founded by Bob Carver and Steve Johnston in 1970
- Linear aerospike engine, a type of rocket engine that maintains its aerodynamic efficiency across a wide range of altitudes, where the "spike", a wedge-shaped protrusion, is a tapered plate
- Linear alternator, an electromechanical type of synchronous generator that is essentially a linear motor used as an electrical generator
- Linear friction welding (LFW), joining components together by melting them by generating heat through mechanical friction, by moving a component in a linear reciprocating motion across the face of a stationary component
- Linear induction motor, an alternating current (AC), asynchronous linear motor that works by the same general principles as other induction motors but is typically designed to directly produce motion in a straight line
- Linear magnification (AKA transverse magnification), enlargement of the apparent size of something, as measured by a linear spatial dimension (length)
- Linear motor, an electric motor that has had its stator and rotor "unrolled", thus it produces a linear force along its length, rather than a rotational force (torque)
- Linear particle accelerator (linac), a machine that accelerates charged subatomic particles or ions to a high speed by subjecting them to a series of oscillating electric potentials along a linear beamline
  - e.g. the Stanford Linear Collider at the SLAC National Accelerator Laboratory
- Linear polarizer/polariser, an optical filter that lets light waves of a specific polarization pass through while blocking light waves of other polarizations, where the resulting polarization is constant
- Linear shaped charge (LSC), an explosive charge shaped to focus the effect of the explosive's energy, with a V-shaped-profile lining
- Linear tracking, a feature of linear turntables, such as in phonographs (AKA gramophones, record players)
- Linear variable filter, such as the covers on SPHEREx's focal-plane arrays that provide narrow-band response with a band center that varies along one axis of the array
- Linear vibration welding, joining materials together by melting them by generating heat through mechanical friction, by placing them in contact and putting them under pressure, then applying an external vibration force to slip the pieces relative to each other, perpendicular to the pressure being applied
- Roland SP-404SX Linear Wave Sampler and Roland SP-404A Linear Wave Sampler, electronic musical instruments

=== Computing ===
- Linear Orbit, Inc., an American software company that develops the Linear project management software
- Digital Linear Tape (DLT; previously called CompacTape), a magnetic-tape data storage technology developed by Digital Equipment Corporation (DEC) from 1984 onwards
- Linear A and Linear B, ECMAScript engines used by the Opera web browser in versions 4.0–9.0; Linear B was used with versions 1.0 and 2.0 of the Presto browser engine
- Linear barcode (AKA one-dimensional barcode, 1D barcode), visual representation of data in machine-readable symbolic form, where values are laid out along only one dimension
- Linear Executable (LE), a mixed 16/32-bit Windows executable file format, introduced with OS/2 2.0
- Linear-feedback shift register (LFSR), a digital circuit where the output of one flip-flop is connected to the input of the next, such that the initial input bit is a linear function of the previous state
- Linear logic programming, a software paradigm based on linear logic
- Linear memory model (AKA flat memory model), a paradigm for accessing memory as a single contiguous address space
- Linear optical quantum computing (AKA linear optics quantum computation, LOQC, photonic quantum computing, PQC), the paradigm of a quantum computer that uses photons as information carriers, and mainly uses linear optical elements to process quantum information
- Linear search (AKA sequential search), the method of searching for a value within a list by checking each element in order until finding the target or reaching the end
- Linear Tape File System (LTFS), a data storage format that allows files stored on magnetic tape to be accessed in a similar fashion to those on disk or removable flash drives
- Linear time, a time complexity of O(n)
- Linear volume, a configuration of data storage drives

==== Linear algebra software ====
Comparison of linear algebra libraries

- Basic Linear Algebra Subprograms (BLAS), a specification that prescribes a set of low-level routines for performing common linear algebra operations
- Linear Algebra Package (LAPACK), a standard software library for numerical linear algebra

=== Electronics ===
- Linear amplifier, a circuit whose output is proportional to its input, but capable of delivering more power into a load, usually referring to a type of radio-frequency (RF) power amplifier used in amateur radio
- Linear element, a component in a circuit in which the constituent relation, between voltage and current, is a linear function, and as such obeys the superposition principle
- Linear power supply, an electrical device that supplies power to a load, where the AC input voltage first passes through a power transformer, then undergoes rectification and filtering to produce a DC voltage
- Linear/ohmic/triode region/mode of a field-effect transistor (FET): the state in which a transistor that uses an electric field to control current through a semiconductor, operates like a variable resistor, with the drain current being proportional to drain voltage
  - In a metal–oxide–semiconductor FET (MOSFET)
  - In a junction FET (JFET)
- Linear regulator, a device used to maintain a steady voltage, where the resistance of the regulator varies in accordance with both the input voltage and the load
- Linear taper potentiometer, an electronic device where the resistance between the contact (wiper) and one end terminal is proportional to the distance between them
- Linear Technology, an American semiconductor company that manufactured integrated circuits
- Linear variable differential transformer (LVDT; also known as linear variable displacement transformer, linear variable displacement transducer, differential transformer), a passive component that transfers electrical energy between circuits, when used for measuring linear displacement (position along a given direction)

=== Mechanical engineering ===
- Linear actuator, machine component that moves in a straight line
- Linear gear, for example, the rack in a rack and pinion assembly

=== Signal processing ===
- Linear phase, a property of a filter where the phase response of the filter is a linear function of frequency
- Linear predictive coding (LPC), a method used mostly in audio signal processing and speech processing for representing the spectral envelope of a digital signal of speech in compressed form, using the information of a linear predictive model
- Linear pulse-code modulation (LPCM), a method used to digitally represent analog signals, in which the quantization levels are linearly uniform
- Linear time-invariant system (LTI system), a system that produces an output signal from any input signal subject to the constraints of linearity and time-invariance

=== Systems ===
- Integral linearity, a measure of fidelity of conversion performed by a measuring system
- Linear control, a type of feedback system wherein the output signal is a sum of values proportional to differences between setpoints and process variable measurements
- Linear system, a mathematical model of a system based on the use of a linear operator

== Units of measure ==
- Linear foot, the number of feet measured in a length of material without regard to the width
- Linear mil, a unit of length equal to a thousandth of an inch (25.4 μm)

== Drawings ==
- Linear scale (AKA bar scale, scale bar, graphic scale, graphical scale), a means of visually showing the scale of a map, drawing, or similar; in simple cases, a line marked at intervals

== Anthropology ==
- Lanchester's linear law, the model of ancient one-on-one combat such that the number of soldiers remaining after the battle is the difference between the sizes of the armies
- Linear hierarchy, an arrangement such that each entity (except for the top and bottom) has exactly one direct subordinate and one direct superior
- (Linear) left–right political spectrum, a system of classifying political positions, ideologies and parties, using a single axis, based on social equality and social hierarchy
- Linear model of innovation, the understand of the relationship of science and technology that begins with basic research that flows into applied research, development and diffusion
- Linear Pottery culture (German: Linearbandkeramik, LBK; also known as Linear Band Ware, Linear Ware, Linear Ceramics, Incised Ware culture), a major archaeological horizon of the European Neolithic period, flourishing c. 5500–4500 BC, within the Danubian I culture of V. Gordon Childe
- Linear responsibility chart (AKA responsibility assignment matrix, RACI matrix), a project management technique that describes the expecations for various stakeholders
- Models of communication § Linear transmission, a kind of model that describes communication as a one-way process of the sender conveying a message to the receiver, without considering any feedback loop

=== Arts, literature, and media ===
- Linear (film), a film that was released with the U2 album No Line on the Horizon
- Linear (group), a pop music group popular in the 1990s
  - Linear (album), their group's debut album
- Linear chromaticism, a compositional technique in music
- Linear counterpoint, a kind of relationship and technique in music
- The Linear Guild, a group of antagonists in the Order of the Stick webcomic
- Linear Motion Battle System, the action-based fighting/combat system in the video game Tales
- Linear perspective (AKA point-projection perspective) in the graphic arts
- Linear television (AKA broadcast programming), content delivered on a set schedule rather than on-demand
- Linear video editing, the post-production process of cutting and recombining strips of film
- Warner Bros. Discovery Global Linear Networks, Warner Bros. Discovery's domestic and international television portfolio including its entertainment, lifestyle, news, sports networks and Discovery+

=== Language ===
- Linearity (writing), the property of writing systems that use connected strokes
- Linear A, a script or writing system that was used by the Minoans of ancient Crete from 1800 BC to 1450 BC
- Linear B, a syllabic script that was used for writing Mycenaean, an early form of the Greek language, c. 1450–1200 BC
- Linear C, the CM1 group of the Cypro-Minoan script, an undeciphered syllabary used on the island of Cyprus and by its trading partners during the Late Bronze Age and Early Iron Age (c. 1550 – c. 1050 BC)
- Linear Elamite, one of a number of scripts used to write the Elamite language
- Linear narrative, a type of story structure where events are largely portrayed in a chronological order
- Linear note-taking, the process of recording information in the order it is received
- Linear order (linguistics) (AKA word order), the arrangement of syntactic constituents

=== Urban development ===
- Linear linkhouse (AKA terraced house, shophouse), a type of medium-density housing with a row of joined houses sharing side walls, as adopted in both Malaysia and Singapore since the countries' early British colonial rule
- Linear park, a green space that is significantly longer than it is wide
- Linear referencing (AKA linear reference system, linear referencing system, LRS), a method of spatial referencing over linear or curvilinear elements
- Linear settlement, a group of buildings that is formed in a long line, usually along a road, body of water, mountain range, or similar

== See also ==
- Linearization
- Nonlinearity (disambiguation)
- Semilinear (disambiguation)
- Bilinear (disambiguation)
- Multilinear (disambiguation)
- Piecewise linear (disambiguation)
- Quasilinear (disambiguation)
- Curvilinear
- Rectilinear (disambiguation)
- Straight (disambiguation)
- Linear mode (disambiguation)
- Lineal (disambiguation)
- Line (disambiguation)
