= Sublinear =

Sublinear or sub-linear means 'below linear' or 'less than linear', and may refer to:

- Sublinear function, a function from a vector space to the real numbers, that is positive-homogeneous and subadditive; all linear functions are also sublinear
- Sub-linear time, a time complexity of o(n), faster than linear
- Sublinear convergence / converging sublinearly, approaching a limit slower than linearly

== See also ==
- Sub (disambiguation)
- Linear (disambiguation)
- Semilinear (disambiguation)
- Quasilinear (disambiguation)
- Nonlinearity (disambiguation)
