= Weld tests for friction welding =

Quality requirements of welded joints depend on the form of application, e.g. in the space or fly industry weld errors are not allowed. Science try to gets good quality welds. There are many scientific articles describing the weld test, e.g. hardness, tensile tests. The weld structure can be examined by optical microscopy and scanning electron microscopy. The computer finite element method (FEM) is used to predict the shape of the flash and interface and others, not only for rotary friction welding (RFW), but also for friction stir welding (FSW), linear friction welding (LFW), FRIEX, and others. Temperature measurements are also carried out for scientific purposes e.g. by use thermocouples or sometimes thermography, mentions about measurements are generally found in research materials and journals.

== See also ==
- Friction welding
- Temperature
- Heat-affected zone
- Weld quality assurance
