= PWL (disambiguation) =

PWL (now Pete Waterman Entertainment) is a record label.

PWL may also refer to:

- Preemptive wear leveling, a storage strategy used on hard disks
- the abbreviation for piecewise linear
- Pwllheli railway station, Gwynedd, Wales (National Rail station code)
- Wirasaba Airport (IATA code)
