= Friction surfacing =

Material coating technique

Friction surfacing is a process derived from friction welding where a coating material is applied to a substrate. A rod composed of the coating material (called a mechtrode) is rotated under pressure, generating a plasticised layer in the rod at the interface with the substrate. By moving a substrate across the face of the rotating rod a plasticised layer is deposited, typically between 0.2–2.5 millimetres (0.0079–0.0984 in) thick with steels on steels, depending on mechtrode diameter and coating material. The process can be used with various metals, including aluminium on to aluminium.

== See also ==
- Friction welding
