= LGE =

LGE may refer to:

- Linear gingival erythema, a periodontal disorder
- LG Electronics, South Korea
- Louisville Gas & Electric, LG&E, Kentucky, US
- Lycée de Garçons Esch-sur-Alzette, a high school in Luxembourg
- Lateral ganglionic eminence, a developmental brain structure.
- Long Eaton railway station, National Rail station code
- Lions Gate Entertainment, US
- Lake Gregory Airport, IATA airport code "LGE"
