= Lineal =

Lineal is a geometric term of location.

Lineal or lineality may also refer to:

- pertaining to a lineage
  - Lineal kinship or "Eskimo kinship"
  - Lineal descendant, a blood relative in the direct line of descent
  - Lineal primogeniture or "Absolute primogeniture"
  - Lineal succession (Latter Day Saints), right of inheritance of church offices
  - Lineal championship, in boxing, "the man who beats the man" takes his championship
  - Matrilineality (AKA matriliny, enatic ancestry, uterine ancestry), a system in which family membership derives from the mother
  - Patrilineality (AKA male line, the spear side, agnatic kinship), a system in which family membership derives from the father
- pertaining to a line
  - Foot (length) or "lineal foot"
  - Lineal typeface (linéales), with no serifs
- Ciudad Lineal, district of Madrid in Spain

== Similar spellings ==
- Lienal, pertaining to the spleen
- Linea (disambiguation)
- Linear (disambiguation)
