= Rectilinear =

Rectilinear means related to a straight line; it may refer to:

- Gnomonic projection, also called rectilinear projection
- Rectilinear grid, a tessellation of the Euclidean plane
- Rectilinear lens, a photographic lens
- Rectilinear locomotion, a form of animal locomotion
- Rectilinear polygon, a polygon whose edges meet at right angles
- Rectilinear propagation, a property of waves
- Rectilinear Research Corporation, a now defunct manufacturer of high-end loudspeakers
- Rectilinear style, the third historical division of English Gothic architecture
- Rectilinear motion or linear motion is motion along a straight line
- Rectilinear prophecy, where a straight line can be drawn from the prophecy to the fulfillment without any branches as in the case of typological interpretations
- Near-rectilinear halo orbit, a highly-elliptical orbit around a Lagrangian point of a moon, that due to the moons orbital movement, will be nearly rectilinear in some frames of reference.

== See also ==
- Linear (disambiguation)
- Straight (disambiguation)
