= Spin welding of polymers =

Spin welding is a form of friction welding used to join thermoplastic parts. The parts to be welded must be round, and in plane with each other. Like all other welding methods this process utilizes heat, time, and pressure to create a weld joint. Heat is generated from friction between the two parts when rotating and subjected to a load normal to the weld joint. This frictional heat causes the plastic to melt and a bond to be created.

Due to this process's high speed, and repeatability it is favored in high production environments. This process was initially used to weld plastic compasses under a liquid to allow the internal parts of the compass to be filled with the liquid, but it is used in a very wide range of industries and applications.

== Spin welding equipment ==
Spin welding machines come in two different types an inertia welding machine, and a continuous drive machine. In general, one of the parts to be welded is clamped in place, while the other is rotated. Spin welding machines consist of two tool fixtures; fixed tooling, and driven tooling.

=== Tooling ===
The tooling in the spin welding machine provides support for the materials being joined while under heat and pressure. Tooling can be made of metal, such as aluminum, or epoxy molding compounds depending on how the tooling will be used. Guards may be incorporated into the tooling to prevent molten material or parts from being ejected.

==== Lower tooling ====
The lower tooling, sometimes referred to as the "nest", supports one of the parts to be welded. The part is usually placed in the nest with the walls supporting the component as close to the joint as possible to prevent distortion of the part during joining.

==== Upper tooling ====
Depending on the design of the machine, the upper tooling may hold a part to be joined or simply apply the necessary pressure and impart rotation to one of the parts being joined. For parts that are held in place by the upper tooling prior to the start of welding, a press fit prevents it from falling. Drive pins, serrations, or a grit blasted finish may be used to help the upper tooling impart rotational force on the part.

=== Inertia welding machines ===
Inertia welding machines use a motor to spin the parts to a set RPM, and then disengages the motor and relies on the friction between the parts to slow down the machine. The inertial energy contained in the machine's flywheel is transferred to the weld interface through the parts. There are also two different designs for inertia welding machines. One such design disengages the clamped part, and allows the whole part to rotate until slowing to a stop, while another allows the parts to continue to rotate until cooling and solidification stops the rotation.

=== Continuous drive welding machines ===
Continuous drive machines operate under the same principle of using a motor to spin the part up to a user determined RPM, but instead of disengaging the drive when welding begins it continues to spin the part through the whole welding cycle. The rotation is stopped via a mechanical braking system that halts the machine either gradually or instantly, depending on the system.

== Process steps ==
This section outlines the overall steps of the spin welding process. This is a description of what is might be observed in a production setting when using the spin welding process.

=== Part preparation and loading ===
Normally parts are loaded into a holding fixture. The parts may be placed in the base of the welding machine or for larger assemblies, one half may be placed in the upper fixture of the welding machine. This process can be accomplished in 2 to 5 seconds when manually loading parts

=== Press actuation ===
The drive motors are activated, and begin to spin The speed of the drive motors can vary, based on the application, from 200 to 14,000 rpm, with a normal speed of 2,000 rpm. The drives then engage the part to be welded. This step normally only takes 1 to 2 seconds.

=== Welding ===
The welding step consists of four main sub-steps which describe how the heat generated from friction melts the parts at their interface. These steps can be described as follows:

==== Phase 1 ====
Friction between parts begins due to rotation from motor and the downward pressure. Heat is generated until the glass transition temperature, for amorphous polymers, or the melting temperature, for semicrystalline polymers, is reached.

==== Phase 2 ====
Part melting begins; material is melted and some of the melted material is extruded into the "flash".

==== Phase 3 ====
A steady state is reached between the melt layer and the amount of material squeezed into the flash. The spinning is then stopped.

==== Phase 4 ====
While the joint cools, the parts are held in contact with each other, under pressure. This ensures a solid mating at the joint while the molten material cools.

Phases 1 through 3 are usually completed in 0.5 to 2 seconds, with an additional 1 to 2 seconds required for Phase 4.

=== Part removal ===
After weld solidification, parts are removed and any required post processing is conducted to remove the flash. This normally takes 2 to 5 seconds to complete.

== Joint design ==
When designing a weld joint, multiple factors are considered. Some examples of those factors include: desired weld strength, geometry of the parts, material being welded, cosmetic of the joint, whether post processing is an option or not. It is important to balance all of these factors to achieve the optimal final part.

In spin welding the most consistent variable is that at least one of the parts needs to be circular for this process to be effective. The simplest joint design in most processes, spin welding included, is a butt joint. This can be used when final part flash is acceptable, this is because there will always be internal flash as well as external flash. A separate process will need to be conducted to remove said flash, and often time the internal flash will be impossible to remove. Due to this, alternative geometries can be used that incorporate flash traps.

Other joints often utilize self-centering geometries such as angled faces, which act as pre-weld sites, and also increase the overall welding area of the joint. However, when using this form of weld joint a flash trap will be difficult to utilize.

== Heat generation ==
Spin welding utilizes internal heat generation which is created from friction between the two parts being welded. In its simplest form spin welding utilizes three main input parameters to vary the welding process. These three parameters can be varied to change the heat generation rate as well. Parameters include: weld RPM, weld pressure, and weld time. Depending on the system, other parameters such as cooling time, displacement, and braking speed can also be altered.

=== Welding time ===
Welding time is defined as how long the parts are rotated while in contact. While welding time does not directly affect the overall heat generation rate, it is an influential factor on how much overall heat is generated throughout the welding process. Usually when utilizing this process there is a threshold time that is necessary to reach a steady state for heat generation. This steady state is defined by when the amount of material melted is equal to the amount of material expelled by the welding pressure. To achieve a quality weld this steady state must be reached for a uniform melt layer.

=== Weld rotations per minute (RPM) ===
The most influential factor when trying to increase heat generation or generation rate is the welding RPM. Several experiments have been conducted, and in general the higher the RPM of the part the more heat that will be generated. This combined with welding time will help to determine the overall heat generated in the weld.

Generally, rotation speeds can be varied between 200 and 14000 RPM depending on the part and application. RPM is the main input parameter to determine heat generation in the part.

When using inertia spin welding consideration must be given to the run up time in order to ensure that the drive head is operating at the proper speed prior to engaging the parts.

When using direct-drive spin welding an optimum RPM should be chosen based on the optimal linear speed of the materials being joined. The required RPM can be calculated using the following equation:

$[Linear Speed]/ [Diameter * \pi]$

=== Weld pressure ===
Pressure also plays a role in heat generation, it is normally a secondary parameter. In general, the higher the pressure the more heat that is generated during welding. This is due to the increase in friction by increasing contact between the parts, this falls off when the pressures become so high that the parts are unable to rotate. Thermoplastic welding will normally use weld pressures between 72.5 psi and 290 psi.

Welding pressure is a parameter determined by the size and area of the part being welded, larger parts require higher pressures to reach the required amount of part upset.

==== Mathematical analysis of heat generation ====
During the spin welding process there are two main phases for heat generation. The initial phase, or the solid phase is when the bulk of the heating in the part is caused by the two solid parts rubbing against one another. The heat generation can be modeled by the following:

$q_y=fpr\omega$

Where q is the heat generation rate, f is the coefficient of friction, r is the radius of the parts being welded, and ω is related to rpm by the following:

$\omega=\Omega*\left ( \frac{2\pi}{60} \right )$

Where Ω is the RPM of the parts being welded.

The Second phase of heat generation is phase 3 of the weld, or the steady-state phase. This is the phase of the process where there is a constant film of molten plastic at the interphase, and viscous heating is dominant. The heat generation can be modeled by the following:

$q_y=\mu*\left ( \frac{r^2*\omega^2}{2h} \right )$

Where $\mu$ is the viscosity of the molten polymer, r is the part radius, ω is related to the RPM as above, and 2h is the thickness of the melt layer.

== Materials ==
The spin welding process can adequately join almost all thermoplastic polymers. Typical with friction welding applications, higher melting temperature materials will require more energy to melt, so they will require more welding time or higher RPMs. Common additives and filler will often alter the weldability of polymers. These additions can make the weld process more difficult, or change the intended properties of the weld.

A note on composite materials, fiber reinforced for example. The reinforcement material will not cross the weld joint, so the intended bulk material properties will vary drastically in the welded region.

A list showing the weldability of common materials is shown below:

Spin welding characteristics of amorphous polymers
Material	Weldability
ABS	Good to excellent
ABS/Polycarbonate alloy	Good
Acrylic	Good
Acrylonitrile styrene acrylate (ASA)	Good
Polyamide-imide (PAI)	Fair to good
Polyarylate	Good
Polycarbonate (PC)	Good to excellent
Polycarbonate/PBT alloy	Good
Polyetherimide	Good
Polyethersulfones (PES)	Good to excellent
Perfluoroalkoxy alkane (PFA)	Poor
Polymethylpentene	Good
Polyurethane	Poor to fair
Polystyrene (PS) (general purpose)	Good to excellent
Polystyrene (PS)(rubber modified)	Good to excellent
Polysulfone (PSO)	Good
PVC (rigid)	Good
Polyvinylidene fluoride (PVDF)	Good
SAN	Good to excellent
Butadiene-styrene	Good to excellent

Spin welding characteristics of semi-crystalline polymers
Material	Weldability
Acetal	Fair to good
Cellulosics	Good
Fluoropolymers	Fair to poor
Liquid crystal polymers	Fair to good
Nylon	Good
Polybutylene terephthalate (PBT)	Good
Polyethylene (PE)	Good
Polyetheretherketone (PEEK)	Fair
Polyethelyne terephthalate (PET)	Fair to good
Polypropylene (PP)	Good to excellent
Polyphenylene sulfide (PPS)	Good

== Applications ==
Spin welding creates a clean and sound weld joint that requires little post processing. Due to this most parts being welded are in the final stages of production, or are in final assembly.

The first known application of spin welding was in the assembly of compasses, however spin welding has become used in a wide variety of products. These products include but are not limited to fuel filters, check valves, truck lights, aerosol cylinders, and floats, as well as some structural components, piping, tanks, and containers.

=== Advantages ===
1. Simple process and equipment
2. Relatively short cycle times
3. Not greatly affected by surface preparation
4. Energy efficient
5. Little excess heat generation
6. Short cooling times
7. No foreign material entry in joint
8. Size of parts joined is only limited by equipment
9. Inertia spin welders are inexpensive

=== Disadvantages ===
1. Limited to circular joints
2. Direct drive spin welders are expensive

In the 1970s, Mattel sold a toy called "Spinwelder", which consisted of a high-speed motor in a handle that spun a small plastic welding rod against a plastic joint to form a bond. Mattel sold construction kits sold for the purpose of assembling with the Spinwelder.
