= Linea (disambiguation) =

Linea is a genus of foraminifera.

Linea may also refer to:

- Lineae, long markings, dark or bright, on a planet or moon's surface
- Fiat Linea, small family car released in 2007
- Linea (Stargate), character in the TV series
- Línea Spanish customary units

Anatomy

- Linea alba (abdomen), fibrous structure that runs down the midline of the abdomen
- Linea alba (cheek), horizontal streak on the mucosal surface of the cheek
- Linea aspera, ridge of roughened surface on the posterior aspect of the femur
- Linea nigra, dark vertical line that appears on the abdomen during pregnancy
- Linea semilunaris, curved tendinous line placed one on either side of the rectus abdominis.
- Linea terminalis or innominate line, consists of the pectineal line, the pubic crest and the arcuate line.

== See also ==
- La Linea (disambiguation)
- Linea 77, Italian nu metal band formed in 1993
- Buccinulum linea linea, lined whelk
- Linea Søgaard-Lidell, Danish politician
