= Bilinear transformation =

Bilinear transformation may refer to:

- Bilinear map or bilinear operator
- Bilinear transform (signal processing), a type of conformal map used to switch between continuous-time and discrete-time representations
- Möbius transformation (complex analysis): a rational function of the form f(z) = (az + b) / (cz + d)

== See also ==
- Bilinear (disambiguation)
