= Straight =

Straight may refer to:

== Arts and entertainment ==
- Straight man, a stock character

=== Film ===
- Straight (2007 film), a German LGBT film
- Straight (2009 film), an Indian bisexual romantic comedy

=== Music ===
- Straight (Tobias Regner album), a 2006 German rock release
- Straight Records, an American label formed in 1969
- "Straight", by American rapper T-Pain on his 2017 album Oblivion
- "Straight", by noise rock band A Place to Bury Strangers on their 2015 album Transfixiation

=== Publications ===
- The Georgia Straight (straight.com), a Canadian weekly newspaper
- Straight, an autobiography by musician Boy George

== Drinks ==
- Straight whiskey, an American grain liquor distillation style
- Straight, liquor ordered without a mixer

== People ==
- Straight (surname), people so named
- Straight, or heterosexual
  - Straight-acting, unstereotypically LGBT
- Straight, a member of the straight edge subculture
- Straight man, a stock character

== Sport and games ==
- Straight (racing), a section of race track
- Cross (boxing), a type of punch
- Straight, a poker hand ranking

== Other uses ==
- Straight, Inc., an American drug rehabilitation program
- Straight, Oklahoma, United States
- Straightedge, a drawing or cutting tool
- Straight line, having zero curvature

== See also ==
- Strait, a body of water
- Strait (surname)
- Straits (disambiguation)
