= Multilinear =

Multilinear may refer to:

- Multilinear form, a type of mathematical function from a vector space to the underlying field
- Multilinear map, a type of mathematical function between vector spaces
- Multilinear algebra, a field of mathematics
