= La Linea =

La Linea (Italian) or La Línea (Spanish, "the line") may refer to:

- La Línea corruption case, Guatemalan corruption case revolving around the former president and vice-president.
- La Línea de la Concepción, a town in Spain bordering Gibraltar
- La Línea (Road Pass), high mountain pass and planned highway tunnel in Colombia
- La Línea (gang), a group of gunmen working for the Mexican Juárez Cartel

== Entertainment ==
- La línea, Spanish language album by Lila Downs.
- La Línea original proposed title of The Line (2009 film), a US action crime thriller set in Mexico with Ray Liotta and Armand Asante
- La Linea (TV series), a series of animated shorts from Italy

== See also ==
- Lineae, long markings on the surfaces of planets and moon
