= Bilinear =

Bilinear may refer to:

- Bilinear sampling (also called "bilinear filtering"), a method in computer graphics for choosing the color of a texture
- Bilinear form, a type of mathematical function from a vector space to the underlying field
- Bilinear interpolation, an extension of linear interpolation for interpolating functions of two variables on a rectilinear 2D grid
- Bilinear map, a type of mathematical function between vector spaces
- Bilinear transform, a method of transforming from the S to Z domain in control theory and signal processing
- Bilinear transformation (disambiguation)
