= Straight (surname) =

Straight is a surname. Notable people with the surname include:

- Beatrice Straight (1914–2001), American actress
- Dorothy Straight (born 1958), American writer
- Henry Harrison Straight (1846–1886), American geologist and professor
- Michael Whitney Straight (1916–2004), American magazine publisher and novelist
- Nina Auchincloss Straight (born 1935), American writer, journalist and socialite
- Paul Staight, Australian badminton player
- Phil Straight (1946–2022), American politician
- Susan Straight (born 1960), American writer
- Whitney Willard Straight (1912–1979), American-born British Grand Prix driver and aviator
- Willard Dickerman Straight (1880–1918), American investment banker
- Alvin Straight (1920–1996), an American man who famously traveled 240 miles (390 km) on a riding lawn mower to visit his ailing brother

== See also ==
- George Strait (born 1952), American country music singer
