= Straits (disambiguation) =

Straits are waterways that connect two larger bodies of water.

It may also refer to:

- Dire Straits, a band
- The Straits, a TV series
