= Linear Orbit, Inc. =

American software company

- Type: Private
- Industry: Computer software; Project management software; Productivity software
- Founded: 2019; 7 years ago
- Key people: Karri Saarinen (CEO); Jori Lallo (CPO); Tuomas Artman (CTO)

Linear Orbit, Inc. is an American software company based in San Francisco, California that develops the project management software Linear. It was founded in 2019 by Jori Lallo, Karri Saarinen, and Tuomas Artman.

As of August 2026, it had over $100 million in annual recurring revenue and a valuation of $2.5 billion. Its customers include OpenAI, Salesforce, and Cursor.

== History ==
Linear was incorporated on January 10, 2019 by Jori Lallo, Karri Saarinen, and Tuomas Artman to build an alternative to the Jira software which they found frustrating and poorly designed; at Airbnb, Saarinen had created his own Chrome Extension to improve his experience using Jira. By April 2019, Saarinen announced they were accepting customers for the waitlist to use Linear. Before the end of the year, they closed $4.2 million in Series A funding led by Sequoia Capital.

Linear became cash-flow positive in 2021.

On January 2022, Saarinen stated that Linear had 17 employees and over 1000 startups as customers.

Linear attained $82 million in Series C funding in June 2025. At this point, they had 80 employees.

In August 2026, employees sold $99 million of their equity in a tender offer led by Accel, valuing the company at $2.5 billion. By this time, Linear had over 40,000 customers including OpenAI, Salesforce, Cursor, Coinbase, and Ramp.

== Corporate Affairs ==
Linear is a remote-first company.
