= Rotary friction welding =

Spinning one metal workpiece against another to join them

Rotary friction welding (RFW) is a type of friction welding, which uses friction to heat two surfaces and create a non-separable weld. For rotary friction welding, this typically involves rotating one element relative to both the other element, and to the forge, while pressing them together with an axial force. This leads to the interface heating and then creating a permanent connection. Rotary friction welding can weld identical, dissimilar, composite, and non-metallic materials. Like other friction welding methods, it is a type of solid-state welding.

== History ==
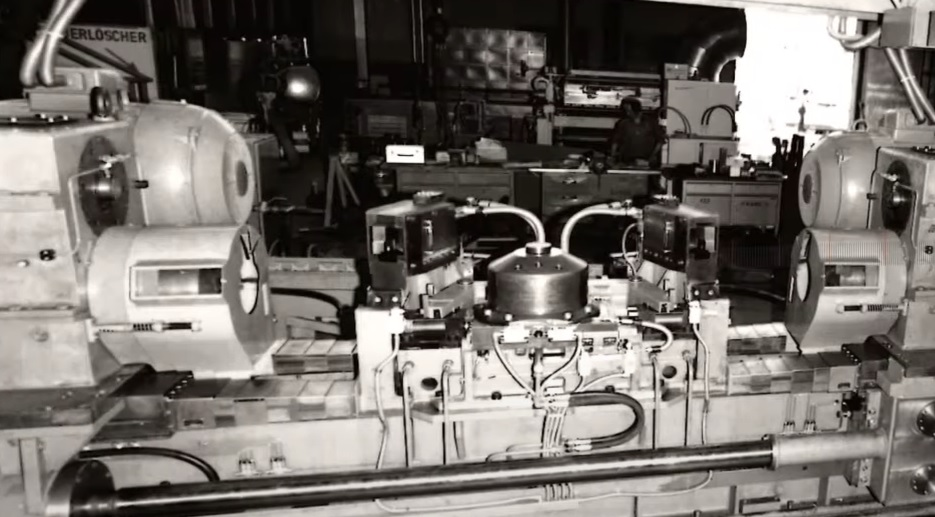
Historical photo of double spindle machine

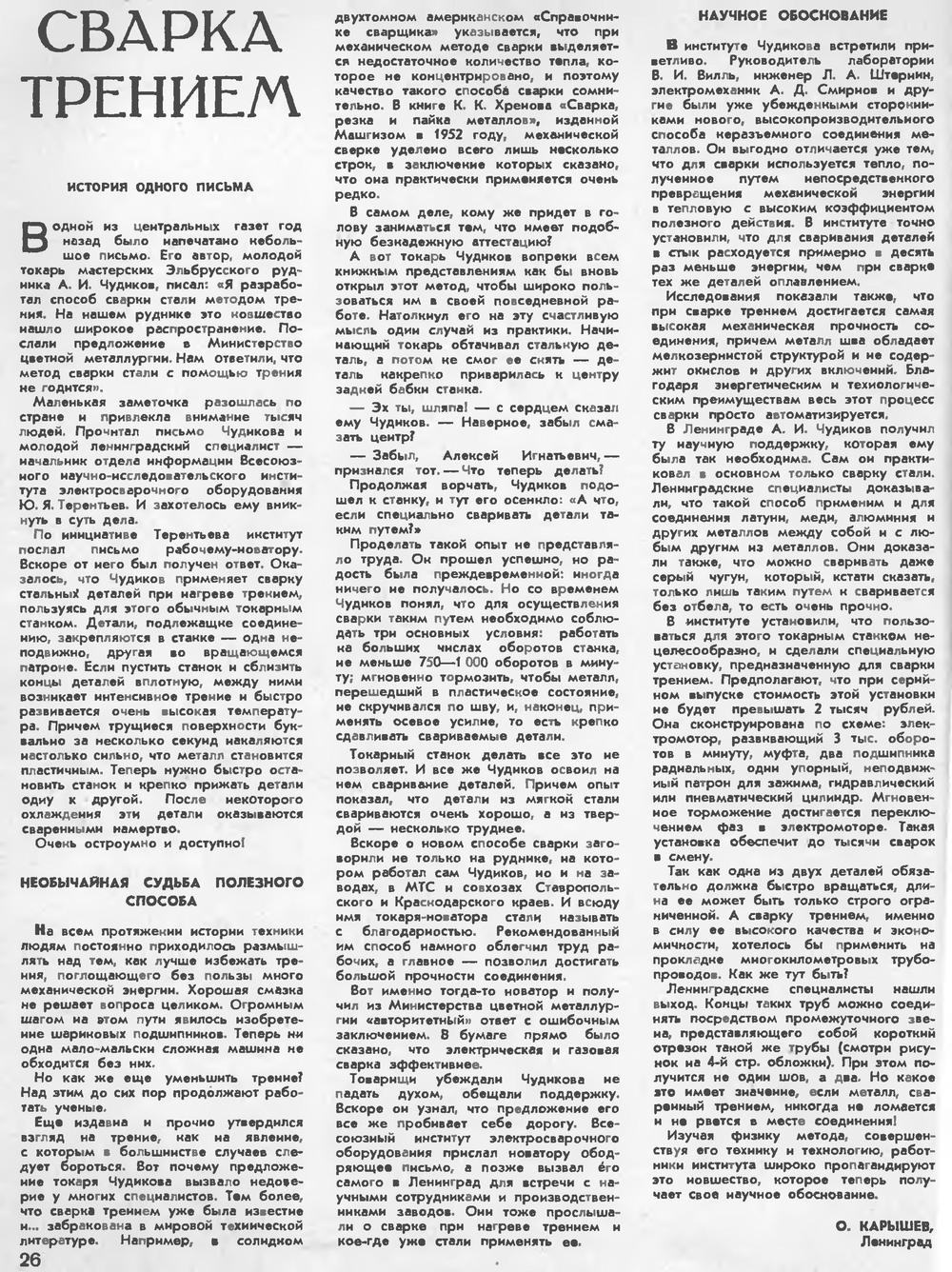
Friction welding description in the newspaper Техника - молодёжи 1958-02, страница 32 from 1958 year .However, the newspaper is about technical science fiction.

Rotary friction is the oldest of all friction welding methods, with a method of rotary friction welding first being patented in 1891. In 1956, the Russian machinist A. J. Chdikov (А. И. Чудиков), after having performed rotary friction welding with a lathe in the Elbrussky mine, would propose its commercial use to the Ministry of Metallurgy. While the Ministry of Metallurgy did not see value in this, it would attract attention from the national Scientific Research Institute of Electrical Welding Equipment, and was gradually disseminated following its publication in newspapers of the Soviet Union.

In 1960, the process would spread to the United States, with American companies such as Caterpillar Tractor Company (CAT), Rockwell International, and American Machine and Foundry developing machines for this process. This led to the development of an inertial friction welding process in 1962, through joint efforts from CAT and Manufacturing Technologies Incorporated (MTI). The 1960s also marked the first research of friction in welding in England by The Welding Institute (TWI). In Europe, KUKA AG and Thompson Friction Welding, would develop a direct-drive process and build a double spindle friction welder. The efficiency of friction welding, both linear and rotary, has been improved by the development of low force friction welding by the Edison Welding Institute and MTI working in collaboration.

== Applications ==
Rotary friction welding is widely implemented across the manufacturing sector and has been used for numerous applications, including:

- Parts in gas turbines.
- Automotive parts
- Monel-to-steel marine fittings
- Cutting tools
- Tublar joints

=== Connections geometry ===
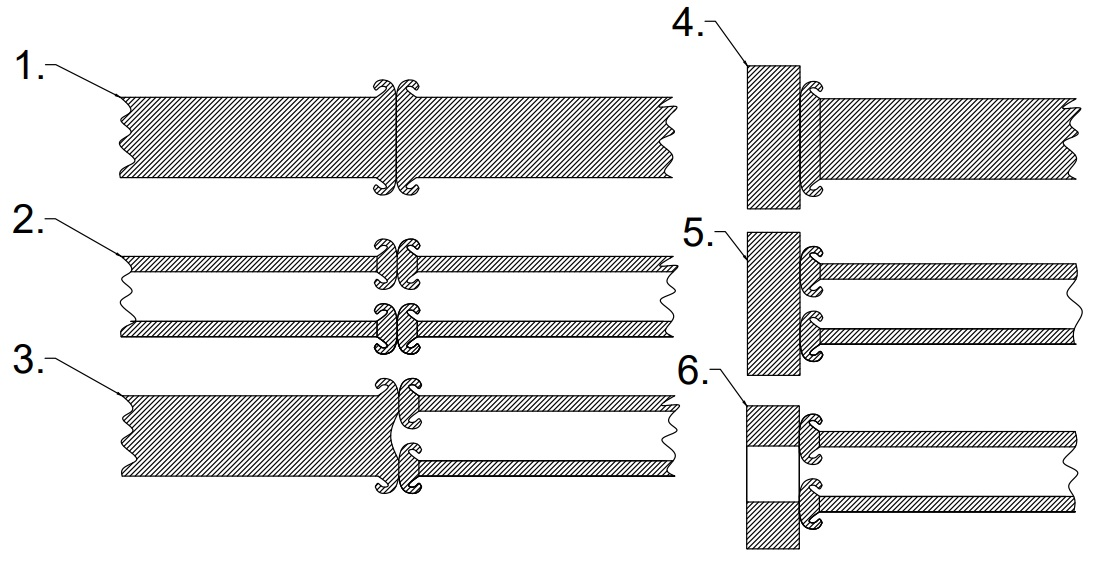
Basic cross sections of rotary friction welding connections.

Rotary Friction Welding can join a wide range of part geometries such as tube to tube, tube to disk, bar to plate. In addition, a rotating ring is used to connect long components.

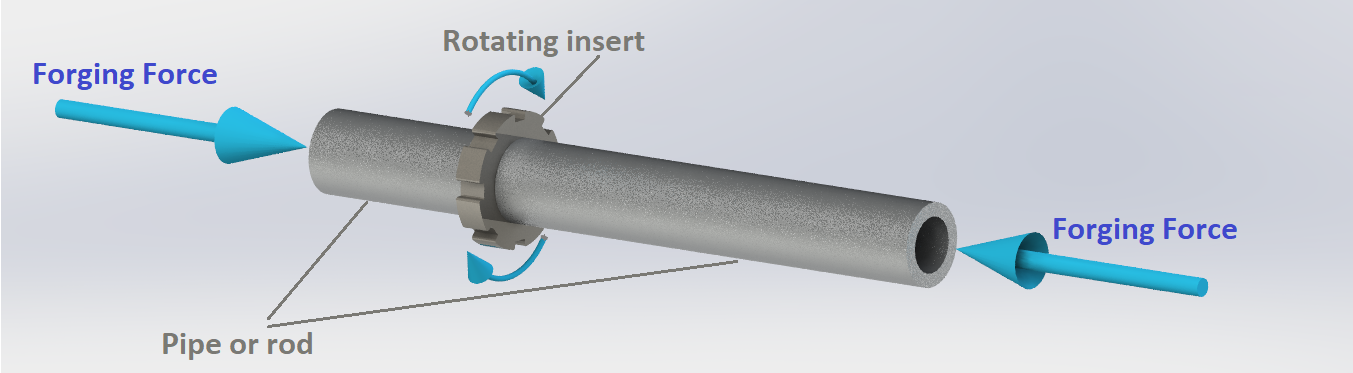
Example of modification standard rotary friction welding from research that may be applicable for long components

The geometry of the component surface does not have to be flat but can also be conical.

== Types of materials to be welded ==
Rotary friction welding enables to weld various materials.

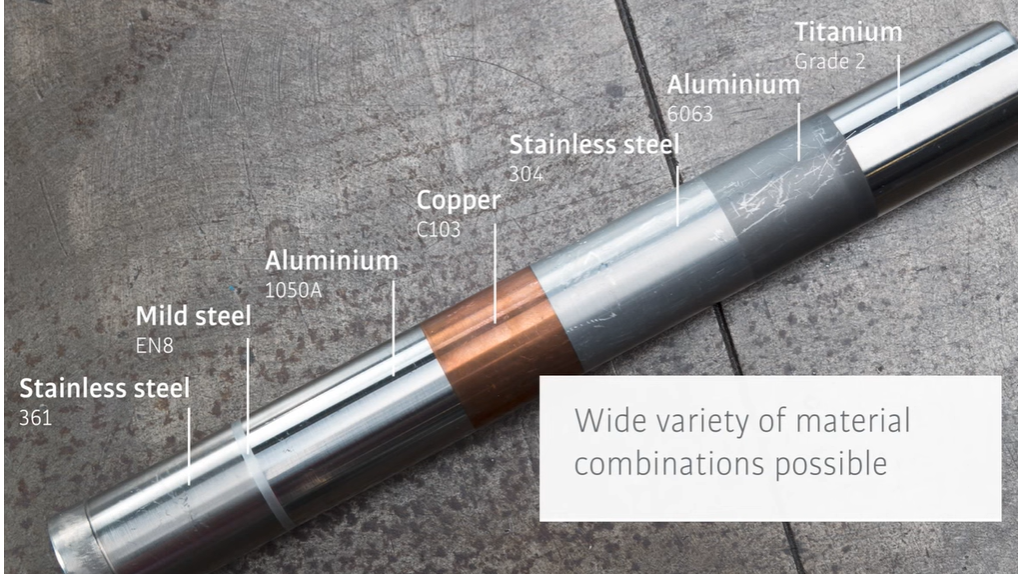
Variety welded metal materials photo.

Metallic materials of the same name or dissimilar either composite,superalloys and non-metallic e.g. thermoplastic polymers can be welded and even the welding of wood has been investigated. Weldability tables of metallic alloy can be found on the Internet and in books.

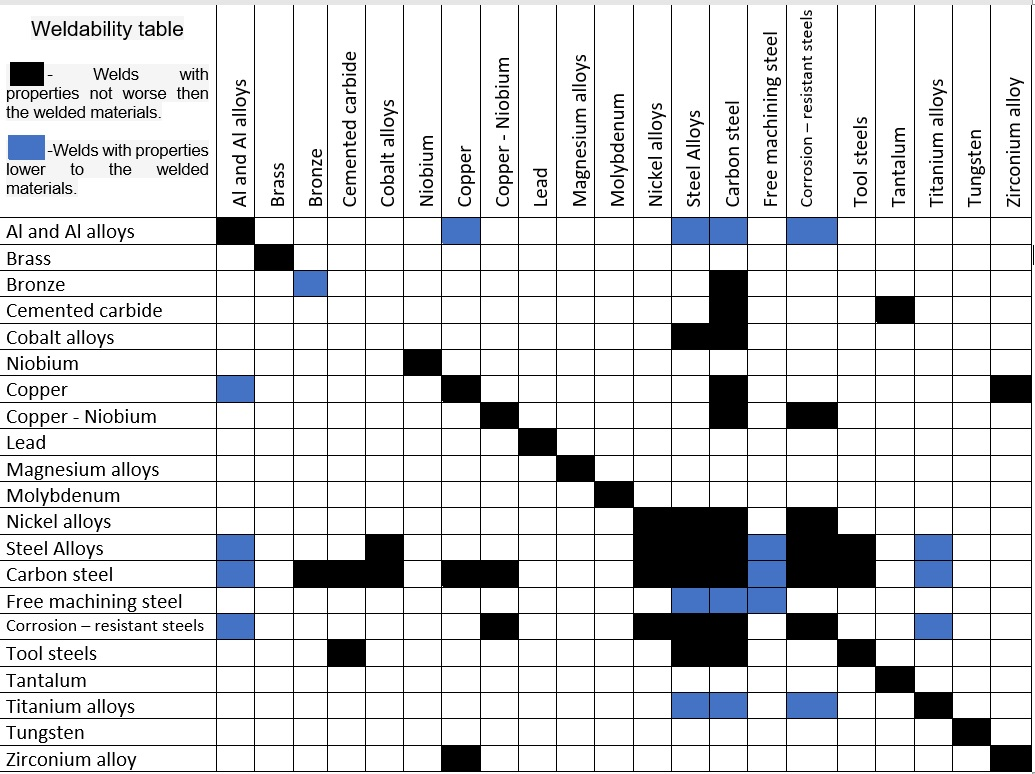
Example of Rotary friction welding weldability table. This is the basic table because the currently known list of materials is much larger and the name alloy systems are classified by a number system (ANSI) or by names indicating their main alloying constituents (DIN and ISO).

Sometimes, an interlayer is used to connect non-compatible materials.

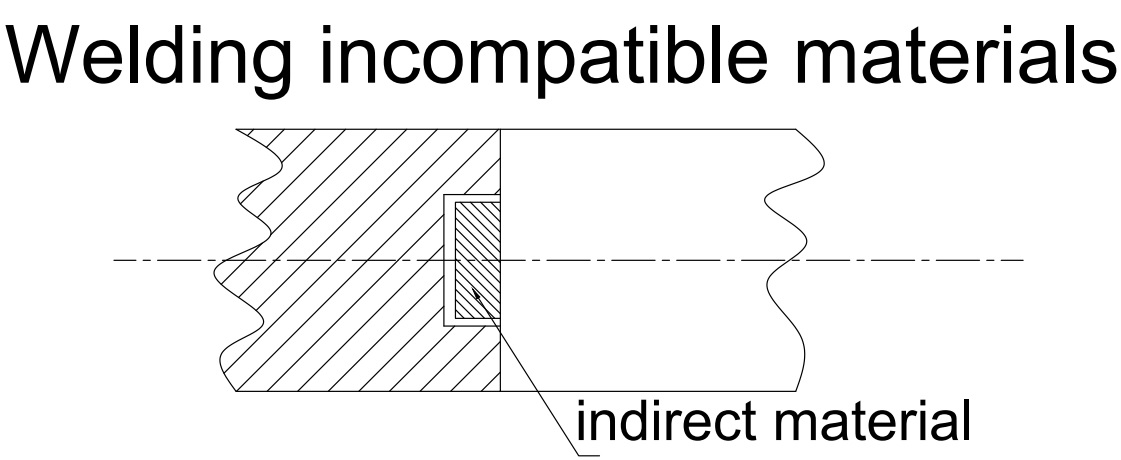
RFW friction welding components interlayer (indirect material)

== Division due to drive motor ==
In direct-drive friction welding (also called continuous drive friction welding), the drive motor and chuck are connected. The drive motor is continually driving the chuck during the heating stages. Usually, a clutch is used to disconnect the drive motor from the chuck, and a brake is then used to stop the chuck.

Example of friction welding with flywheel.

In inertia friction welding the drive motor is disengaged, and the workpieces are forced together by a friction welding force. The kinetic energy stored in the rotating flywheel is dissipated as heat at the weld interface as the flywheel speed decreases. Before welding, one of the workpieces is attached to the rotary chuck along with a flywheel of a given weight. The piece is then spun up to a high rate of rotation to store the required energy in the flywheel. Once spinning at the proper speed, the motor is removed and the pieces forced together under pressure. The force is kept on the pieces after the spinning stops to allow the weld to "set".

== Stages of process ==
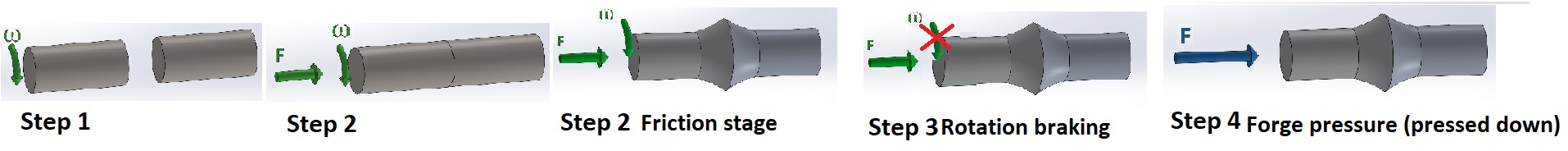
Steps of typical rotary friction welding.

- Step 1 and 2, friction stage: one of the components is set in rotation, and then pressed to the other stationary one in axial of rotation,
- Step 3, braking stage: the rotating component is stopped in braking time,
- Step 4, upsetting stage: the welded elements are still forging by forge pressure (pressed down),
- Step 5: in standard RFW welding (standard parameters), a flash will be created. Outside flash can be cut off on the welder.

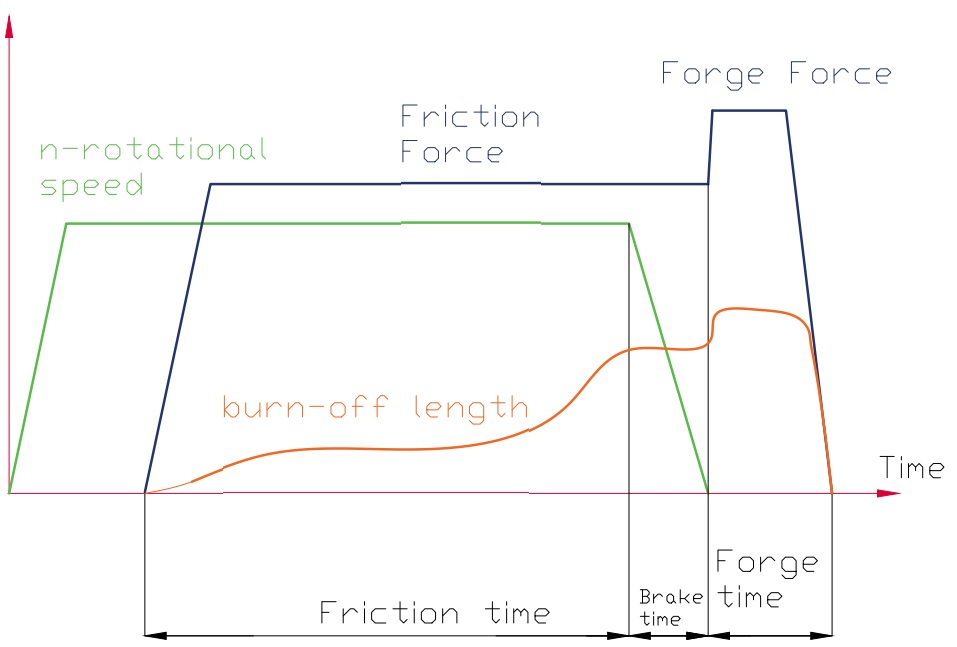
Exemplary stages of typical process RFW welding on the chart, but there exist modifications and then the timings of stages do not have look like this.

However, referring to the stages chart:

- modifications of the process exist,
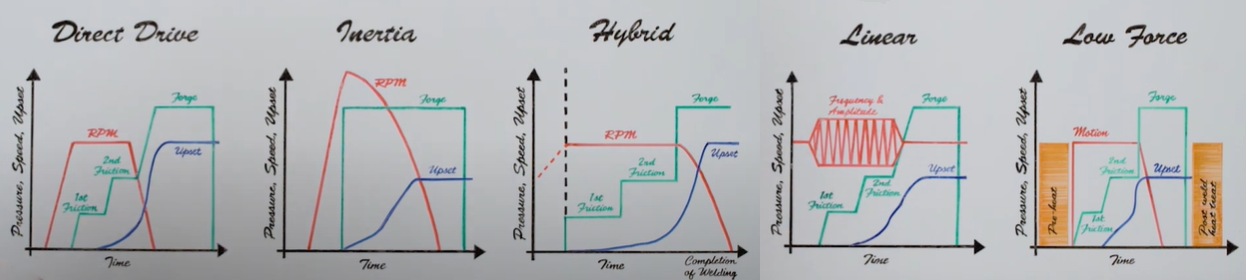
  Chart comparison in several friction welding methods.
- may depend on the version of the process: direct-drive, inertia friction welding, hybrid welding,
- there are many versions of welding machines,
- many materials can are welded with not the same properties, with various geometries,
- the real life process does not have to match to the ideal settings on the welding machine.

== RFW Friction work on cylindrical rods workpieces ==
Friction work create weld and can believe that is calculated for cylindrical workpieces from math:

Work:

(1) $W = M \times \alpha$

Moment of force M general formula:

(2) $M = r \times F$

The force F will be the frictional force T (F=T) so substituting for the formula (2):

(3) $M = r \times T$

The friction force T will be the pressure F times by the friction coefficient μ:

(4) $T = \mu \times F$

So moment of force M:

(5) $M = r \times \mu \times F$

The alpha angle that each point will move with the axis of rotating cylindrical workpieces will be:

(6) $\alpha = 2 \pi \times n \times t$

So friction work:

(7) $W = n\times \pi \times r\times F\times \mu\times t$

For variable value μ over friction time:

(8) $W = n\times \pi \times r\times F\times \int_{0}^{t} f(\mu) \,dt$

This requires verification but from the equation it appears that turnover and force (or pressure on surface $F = p (\text{pressure}) * A (\text{area})$) is linear to friction work (W) so for example if the pressure increases 2 times then the friction work also increase 2 times, if the turnover increase 2 times then the friction work also increase 2 times and referring to conservation of energy this can heat 2 times the material to the same temperature or the temperature may increase 2 times. Pressure has the same effect over the entire surface but rotation has more impact away from the axis of rotation because it is a rotary motion. Referring to thermal conductivity the friction time affects to the flash size when shorter time was used then friction work is more concentrated in a smaller area.

or variable values μ, n, F over friction time:

(9) $W = \pi \times r\times \int_{0}^{t} f(\mu) f(n) f(F) \,dt$

- t [s]- time of friction (when piece rotary),
- μ - coefficient of friction,
- F [N]- pressure force,
- r [m]- radius of workpiece,
- n [1/s] - turnover per second,
- W [J] - friction work.

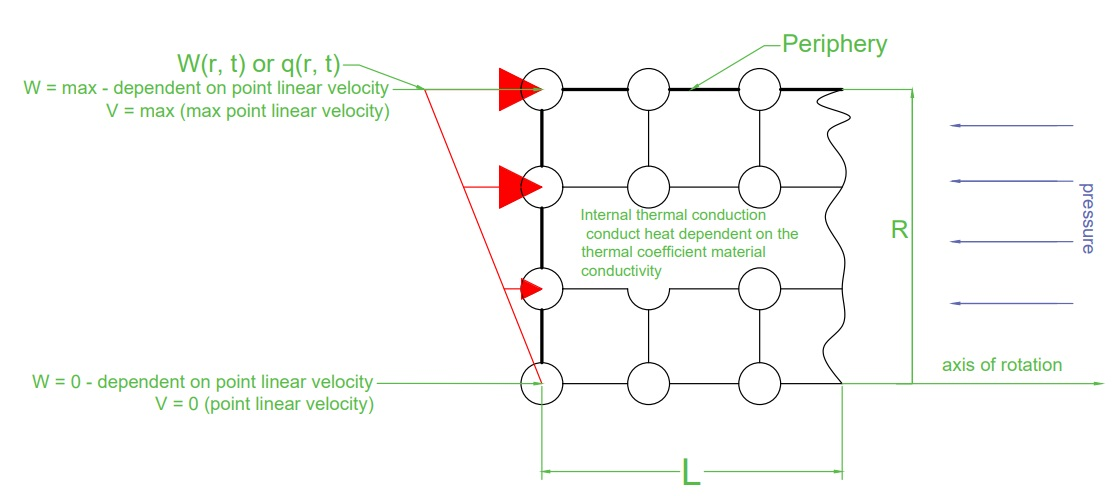
Simplified welding process on the picture.

Therefore, this way of calculating is not reliable in reality, which is more complicated. An example article considering the variable depends on the temperature coefficient of friction steel - aluminum Al60611 - Alumina is described by authors from Malaysia in for example this paper "Evaluation of Properties and FEM Model of the Friction Welded Mild Steel-Al6061-Alumina", in this paper is possible to find the selection of the mesh type in the simulation described by the authors and there are some instructions such as use the Johnson-Cook material model choice, and not only, there is dissipation coefficient value, friction welding condition, the article included too the physical formulas related to rotary friction welding described by the authors such as: heat transfer equation and convection in rods, equations related to deformation processes. Article included information on the parameters of authors research and it is not the only position in literature. The conclusion include information that: "Even though the FE model proposed in this study cannot replace a more accurate analysis, it does provide guidance in weld parameter development and enhances understanding of the friction welding process, thus reducing costly and time consuming experimental approaches."

The coefficient of friction changes with temperature, and there are a number of other factors, including internal friction (measured in viscosity, e.g., dynamic viscosity according to Carreau's fluid law), forge, variable properties of the material during welding, and plastic deformation.

Carreau's fluid law:

Generalized Newtonian fluid where viscosity, $\mu_{\operatorname{eff}}$, depends upon the shear rate, $\dot \gamma$, by the following equation:

(10) $\mu_{\operatorname{eff}}(\dot \gamma) = \mu_{\operatorname{\inf}} + (\mu_0 - \mu_{\operatorname{\inf}}) \left(1+\left(\lambda \dot \gamma\right) ^2 \right) ^ {\frac {n-1} {2}}$

Where:

- $\mu_0$, $\mu_{\operatorname{\inf}}$, $\lambda$ and $n$ are material coefficients.
- $\mu_0$ = viscosity at zero shear rate (Pa.s)
- $\mu_{\operatorname{\inf}}$ = viscosity at infinite shear rate (Pa.s)
- $\lambda$ = relaxation time (s)
- $n$ = power index

Modelling of the frictional heat generated within the RFW process can be realized as a function of conducted frictional work and its dissipation coefficient. Incremental frictional work of a node 𝑖 on the contacting surface can be described as a function of its axial distance from the rotation centre, current frictional shear stress, rotational speed and incremental time. The dissipation coefficient 𝛽_{FR} is often set to 0.9 meaning that 90% of frictional work is dissipated into heat.

(11) 𝑑𝑞_{FR}(𝑖) = 𝛽_{FR} ∙ 𝑑𝑊_{FR}(𝑖) = 𝛽_{FR} ∙ 𝜏𝑅(𝑖) ∙ 𝜔 ∙ 𝑟𝑖 ∙ 𝑑𝑡 on contacting surface of node 𝑖

- 𝛽_{FR} - dissipation coefficient,
- 𝑊_{FR} - frictional work,
- 𝑟𝑖 - distance from the rotation centre,
- dt - time increment,
- 𝜏𝑅(𝑖) - current frictional shear stress,
- 𝜔 - rotational speed.

Friction work can also calculate from power of used for welding and friction time (will not be greater than the friction time multiply to the power of the welder - engine of the welder) referring to rules conservation of energy. This calculation looks the simplest.

(12) E = Pxt or for not constant power $E = \int_{0}^{t} f(P) \,dt$

- E - energy,
- P - power,
- t - power runtime.

However, in this case, energy can be also stored in the flywheel if is used depending on the welder construction.

General flywheel energy formula:

(13) $E_k = \frac{1}{2} I \omega^2$

where:

- $E_k$ is the stored kinetic energy,
- ω is the angular velocity, and
- $I$ is the moment of inertia of the flywheel about its axis of symmetry.

Sample calculations not by computer simulation also exist in the literature, for example, in a 1974 script related to power input and temperature distribution.

K. K. Wang and Wen Lin from Cornell University in "Flywheel friction welding research" manually calculates welding process, and even at this time, the weld structure was analysed.

Overall, calculations can be complex.

== Weld Zone Description ==
=== Weld photo gallery ===
Rotary friction welding weld photo. Weld without clearly formed flash. No flash but something like the upset is visible on the right component (torsion line is not visible). The scale of the calliper is in mm.In this case, a very short friction time was used, so real-time and direct temperature measurement of the weld center can be problematic. Moreover, welding in a short time causes risks of imperfections, such as weld discontinuities.	Welded rods of inconel 600 and inconel 718 superalloy after destructive tensile test.	Photo of friction welded API 5L X46 pipeline with diameter of 220 mm and wall thickness of 8 mm. The typically flash is visible on the image. Internal significant flash is visible and can be difficult to remove in pipeline.
Typical rotary friction welding joint. Dissimilar materials (stainless steel and copper) with 24 mm diameter and 75mm length were welded.	Friction welded rods of aluminium AA1050 and AISI 304 stainless steel, with diameter of 14.8 mm.Rods before and after welding prepared for tensile test. The AISI 304 stainless steel has higher strength than the aluminum alloy. Hence, the formation of flashes was restricted to AA1050 aluminum only.	Rods of aluminium AA1050 and AISI 304 stainless steel after tensile test. Rupture occurred on aluminium site away from the bonding interface.
Tungsten-steel weld.Some materials can be problematical to weld, like those with a high melting point and differences in physical properties, such as molybdenum, tantalum, tungsten. The photo shows a significant difference in melting between tungsten and steel. There are some methods to solve this problem, such as preheating materials with a high melting point.		

=== Heat and mechanical affected zones ===
Friction work is converted into increased temperatures at the welding zone, and as a result, the weld structure is changed. In typical rotary friction welding processes, rise of temperature at the beginning of processes should be further from the axis of rotation, because points further from the axis have greater linear velocity. During the weld, the temperature disperses according to the thermal conductivity of the welded parts.

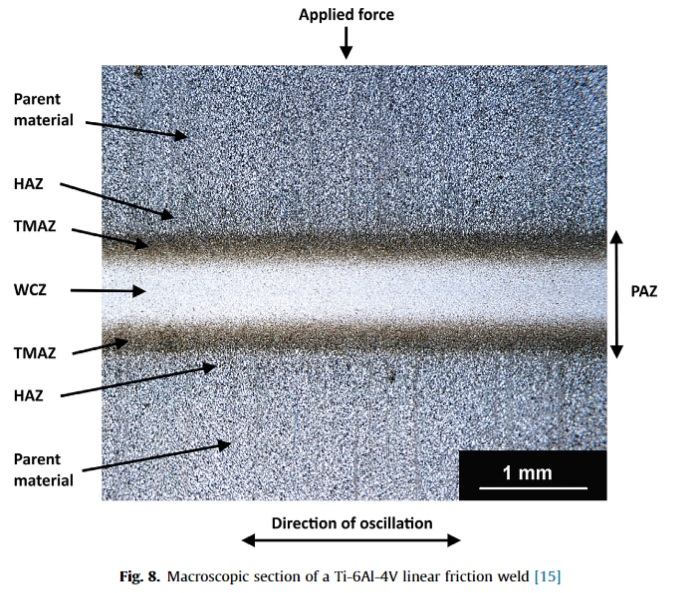
Picture shows weld zones in friction welding.

Zones:

- WCZ—weld center zone,
- HAZ—heat affected zone,
- TMAZ—Thermo-Mechanically Affected Zone,
- BM—base material, parent material,
- Flash

Both the WCZ and the TMAZ are thermo-mechanically affected. However, due to differences in the microstructures, they are classified independently. One such difference is that only the WCZ undergoes dynamic recrystallization. The Plastically Affected Zone (PAZ) is the region between the two TMAZ-HAZ boundaries, also known as the TMAZ thickness. The HAZ can also be subdivided based on temperature differences within it.

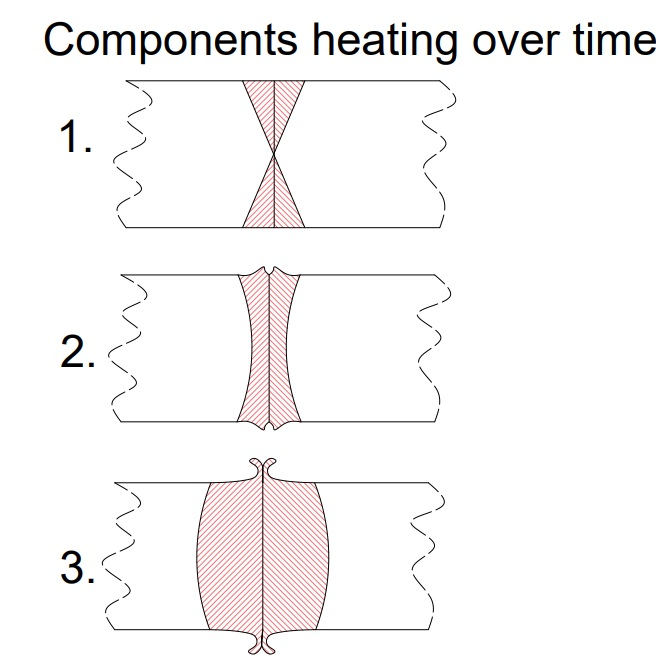
Components heating over time.

Next, the heat spreads, and the material is pushed out, creating a flash which can be cut off on the welding machine.

== Weld measuring system ==
To provide knowledge about the process, monitoring systems are often used and this are carried out in several ways which affects the accuracy and the list of measured parameters.

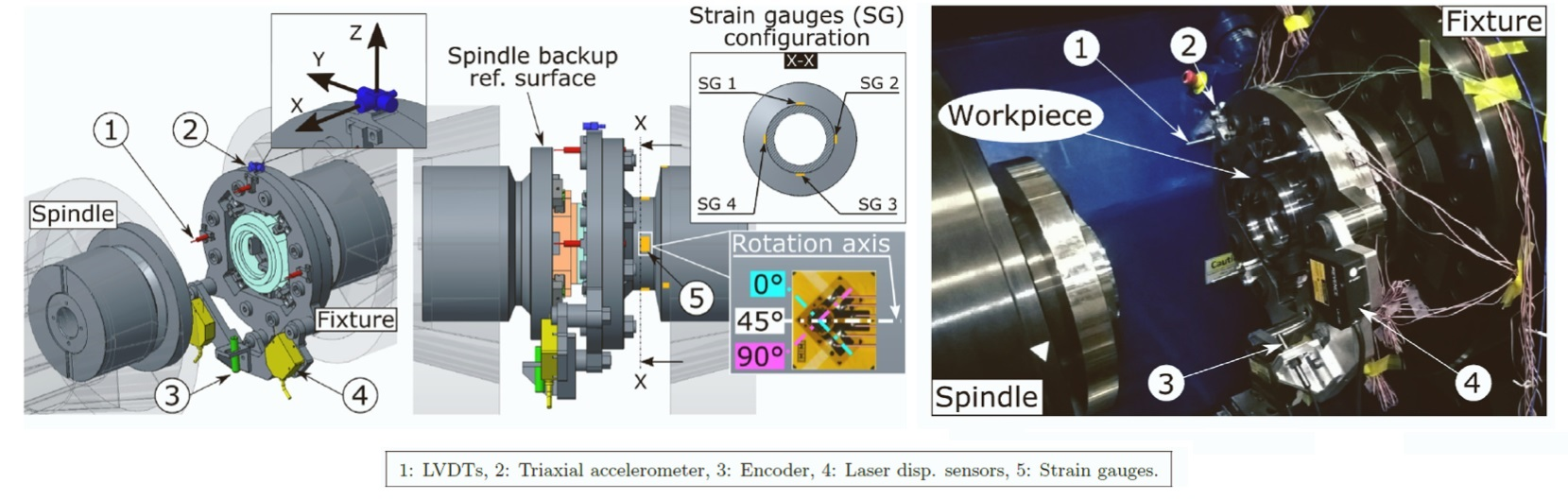
The computer aided design image point out the location of the sensors and on the photo is shown the real view of the Inertia Friction Welding (IFW) machine with mounted sensors.There is situated Linear Variable Differential Transformer (LVDTs), triaxial accelerometer, encoder, laser sensors, strain sensors.

The list of measured and calculated parameters can looks like this:

- axial force and pressure,
- angular - rotation speed,
- spindle centre,
- velocity,
- vibration,
- length (burn off rate),
- temperature.

=== Temperature measuring systems ===
Examples of weld measurements. In the literature, can be found measurements of the thermal weld area with thermocouples and not only the non-contact thermographic method is also used.

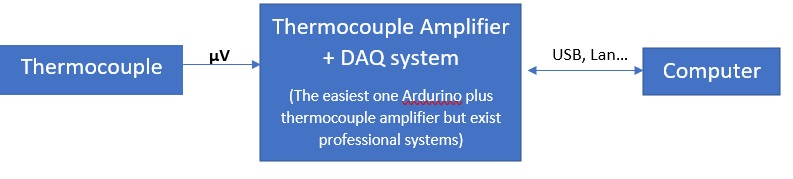
Just an example for measuring by the contact thermocouple methods.

However, it also depends on the specific case for a very small area of the weld and HAZ there are cans by difficulties in thermal measuring in real time it can be calculated later after friction time there is heat flow.

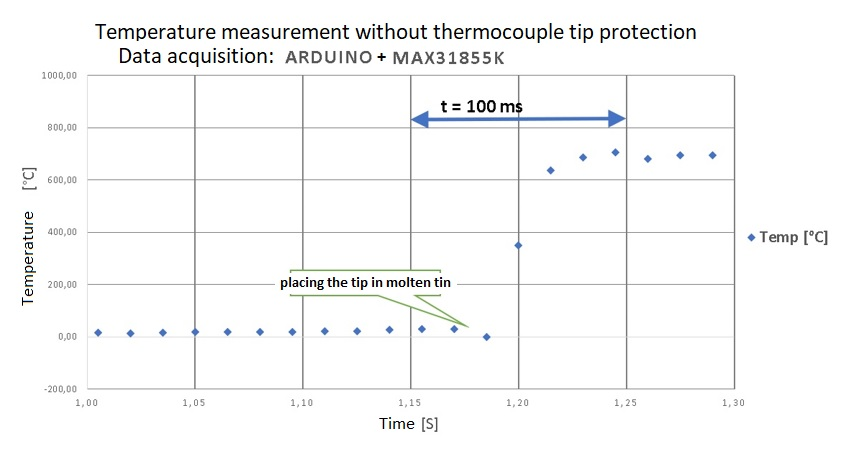
This is another example of a measurement but can be referenced. The thermocouple response can be in a dozen millisecond, but thermocouple tip is all in hot tin additionally, this thermocouple was without a cover for shortened response time yet the cover protects the thermocouple. This example is not from friction welding but from measuring the temperature of hot tin.

== Research, temperature, parameters in the rotary friction welding process ==
Quality requirements of the welded joints depend on the application, for example weld defects are not permiited in the aeronautical or aerospace industries. Science tries to gets good quality welds, also some people have been interested in many years in welding knowledge, so there are many scientific articles describing the methods of joining, for example Bannari Amman Institute of Technology, published in 2019 year a literature review.

They are performed weld tests which give knowledge about mechanical properties of material in welded zone e.g. hardness tests, and tensile tests are performed. Based on the tensile tests the stretch curve are created which can give directly knowledge about ultimate tensile strength, breaking strength, maximum elongation and reduction in area and from these measurements the Young's modulus, Poisson's ratio, yield strength, and strain-hardening characteristics is created.

Where, the articles often contain only data related to tensile tests such as:

- Yield Strength in MPa
- Ultimate Tensile Strength in MPa
- Elongation in % percentage

Where the units of SI are: K, kg, N, m, s and then Pa and this knowledge about this is needed for introducing data, material properties and not do errors in simulation programs.

Research articles also often contain information about:

- chemical composition of connected components

and inclusion process parameters is obvious such as:

- Friction Pressure (MPa)
- Friction Time (s)
- Welding Speed (rpm)
- Upset Pressure (MPa)
- Upset Time (s)

Is also possible to find descriptions in research literature about: mechanical properties, microstructure, corrosion and wear resistance, and even cytotoxicity welded material.

However, why research connect topic of cytotoxicity to welding if it is a subject not closely related (cytotoxicity is the quality of being toxic to cells). On this article can write that exist same off toxic metals and metals vapors such as polonium. It can be written than in some cases when welding at high temperatures, harmful metal vapors are released and then protection is recommended such as access to fresh air and exhaust these vapors to outside.

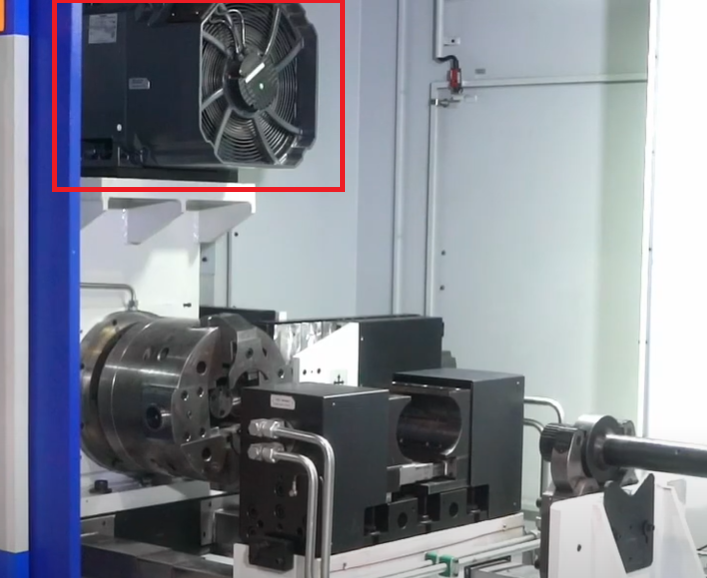
Vapor extractor in welder.

There are several methods to determine the quality of a weld and for example the weld microstructure is examined by optical microscopy and scanning electron microscopy.

The computer finite element method (FEM) is used to predict the shape of the flash and interface, not only for rotary friction welding (RFW), but also for friction stir welding (FSW), linear friction welding (LFW), FRIEX.

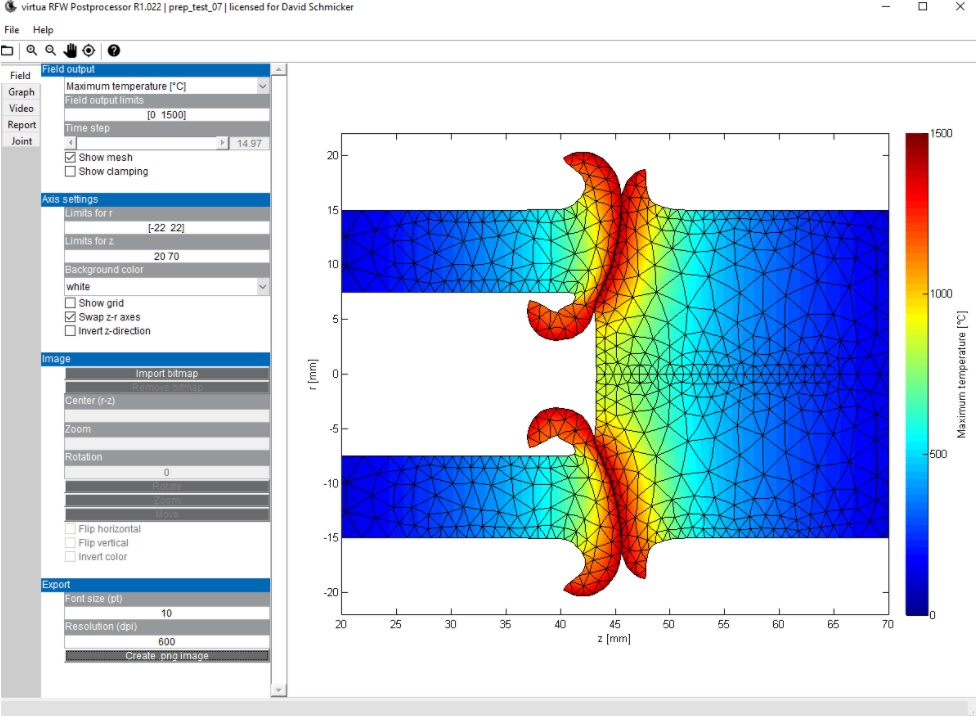
Example Friction welding simulation in dedicated commercial sampro-software for Rotary Friction Welding. However, it is not free and open source program (in 2023 year). There exist also general moreover expanded software for FEM simulation, sometimes free and open-source - List of finite element software. However, there is a problem: simulation welding requiring users skills, appropriate software and knowledge, sometimes comparisons with real similar examples, it is not very easy and the files are not shared or instructions of welding contains errors.

In addition to the weld testing, the weld heat-affected zones are described. Knowledge of the maximum temperatures in the welding process make it possible to define the area structural changes. Process are analisis e.g. temperature measurements are also carried out for scientific purposes research materials, journals, by use contact thermocouples or sometimes no contact thermography methods. For example, an ultra fine grain structure of alloy or metal which is obtained by techniques such as severe plastic deformation or Powder metallurgy is desirable, and not changed by the high temperature, a large heat affected zone is unnecessary. Temperature may reduce material properties because dynamic recrystallization will occur, there may be changes in grain size and phase transformations structures of welded materials. In steel between austenite, ferrite, pearlite, bainite, cementite, martensite.

Various parameters of welding are tested. The setting of the completely different parameters can obtain different weld for example the structure changes will not be the same width. It is possible to obtain a smaller heat-affected zone (HAZ) and a plastically affected zone (PAZ). The width of the weld is smaller. The results are for example not the same in welds made for the European Space Agency with a high turnover ω = 14000 rpm or from Warsaw technical university 12000 rpm and no typical very short friction time only 60 milliseconds instead of using a standard parameters, in addition, in this case, ultra fine grain alloy was welded, but for this example the welded rod workpiece was only 6mm in diameter so it is small rod friction welding another close to this examples with short friction time only e.g. 40 ms also exist in literature but also for small diameter. Unfortunately, welding in very short time carries the risk of welding imperfections such as weld discontinuities.

Welding imperfections such as weld discontinuities. - Risk of welding in very short time. Moreover research articles do not always describe the risks.	Corner problem in friction welding with specific parameters time below 100 ms and conical contact surface. There is a complete weld inside but corner is not welded. In individual cases this can be initially predicted and some case is possible make the welded elements with a larger diameter and after welding turn on a lathe. Appropriate parameters, tests, are also helpful it may be also a solution before welding preheating of the front surface to the appropriate temperature. However to sum up, the photo shows the corner problem.

Some cases of welding are made only individually or only in research such as: The welds created in with specific parameters such as welding time below 100 ms, with an appropriate front surface for example (conical contact surface), with materials that are difficult to weld (tungsten to steel), these are not always serial production.

The rotations in the research literature for small diameters can be more as standard even e.g. 25000 rpm. Unfortunately the diameter of the workpiece can be a limitation to the use of high speeds of rotation.

The key points to understand is that: Fine grain of the welded metal material according to Hall-Petch relation should have better strength and for the description of one technique for obtaining this material Percy Williams Bridgman won the Nobel Prize in Physics in 1946 referring to the achievements related to High-pressure torsion (HPT). However, High-pressure Torsion is obtained only thin film thickness material.

Hall-Petch relation.	Stress-strain curve typical of a low carbon steel.

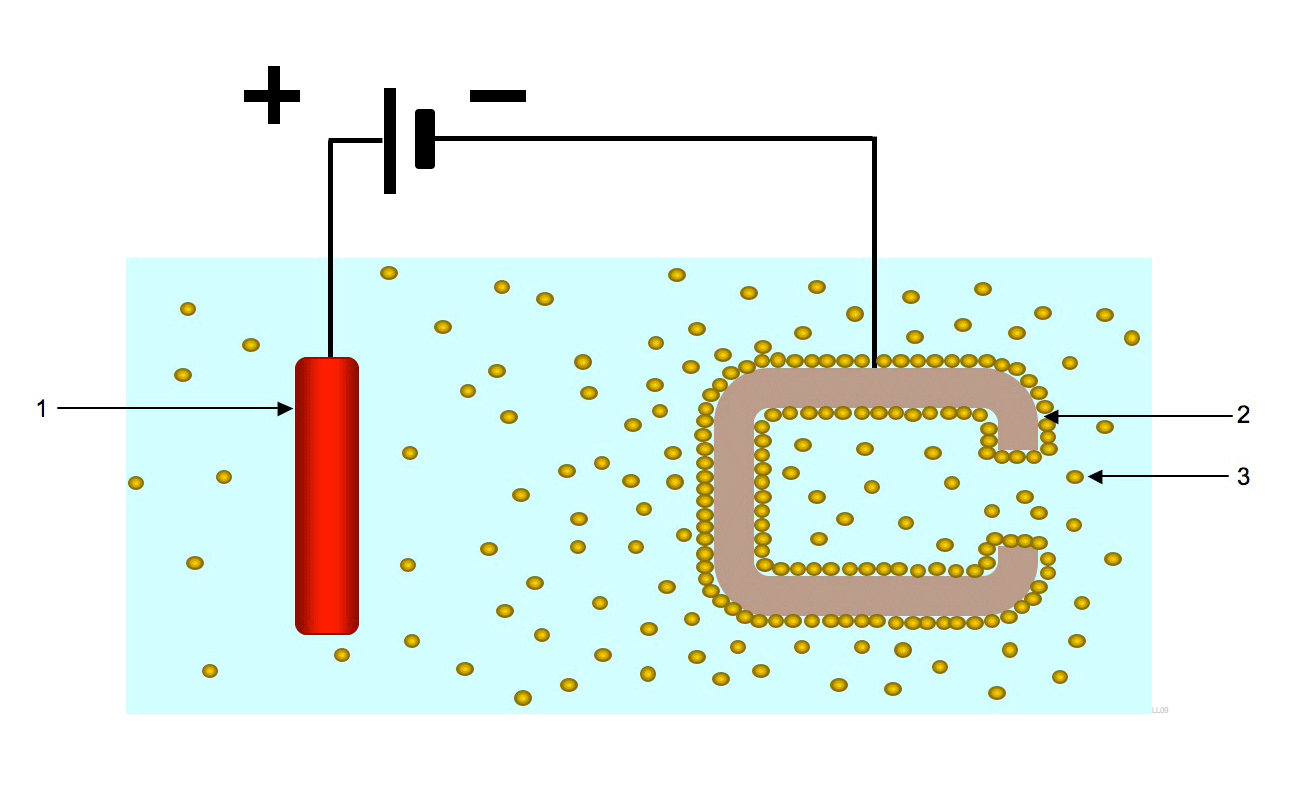
The research electrodeposition deposition technique of applying an intermediate interlayer. The properties of this layer are used later for welding. However, in this study, nickel interlayer thickness was of 70 $\mu$m (micrometre )and in this case only small rods of 12mm diameter were welded.

There is also research into the introduction of interlayers. Even though dissimilar material joining is often more difficult the introduction for example nickel interlayer by an experimental electrodeposition deposition technique to increase the connection quality has been investigated by the Indian Institute of Metals, however in this case nickel interlayer thickness was of 70 $\mu$m (micrometre ) and only small rods of 12mm diameter were welded. This nickel layer is only on top of the welded parts. In addition, this topic is not very related to welding but nickel layer may affect off corrosion resistance.

Some scientists describe material research. Group of known materials is large includes: Ni nickel based superalloys such as Inconel, ultra-fine grain materials such as ultra-fine grain aluminum, low carbon steel e.g. Ultra Low Carbon Bainitic Steel (ULCBS). Friction welding is used for connection many materials including superalloys for example nickel-based Inconel, scientists describe connecting various materials and on the internet is possible finding articles about this and same part of the research relates to joining superalloys materials or materials with improved properties. Nickel based superalloys exhibit excellent high temperature strength, high temperature corrosion and oxidation resistance and creep resistance. However, referring to this research good add that nickel is not the most common and cheapest material: Prices list of chemical elements.

=== Parameters ===
- Turnover: Typically turnover is selected depending on the type of material and dimensions of welded parts have different values: 400 - 1450 rpm, sometimes max 10000 rpm. Not typically, in research literature turnover is to 25000 rpm.
- Friction time: typically 1 - to several dozen seconds. Not typically, in research literature friction time can be in tens of milliseconds, however when time is very short and parameters are not typical process can require a lot of preliminary preparation and testing to the positive result.
- Forge time: Up to a few seconds.

However, the parameters will be different as elements of different sizes can be welded. For example, can be produced ranging from the smallest component with a diameter of 3 mm to turbine components with a diameter in excess of 400 mm.

By combining methods for connecting long elements, future science may study the friction welding of rails for the high speeds railway industry. For example, techniques like preheated low-force linear friction welding or modified linear friction welding (LFW) method, potentially using a vibrating insert (like the rotating insert in the FRIEX method) could be developed. If suitable machinery is created, these approaches may become viable. Importantly, most attention should be directed toward traveler safety as the top priority.

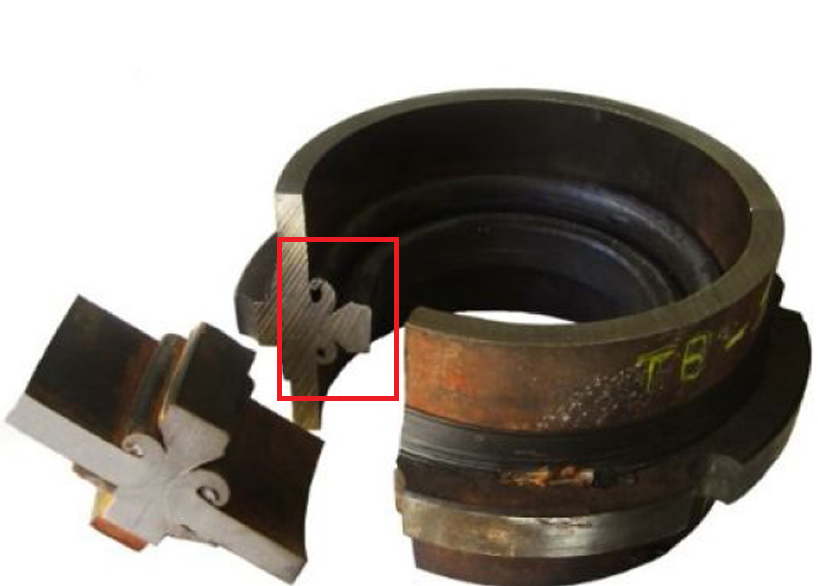
For example, the article:"Pipeline girth friction welding of the UNS S32205 duplex stainless steel" describes friction welding of pipeline.However, in this case is problem, on the photo is clearly visible internal flash, not recommended and difficult to remove.

Preliminary research involving similar welds and geometry has shown improved tensile strength and increased performance in the fatigue tests.

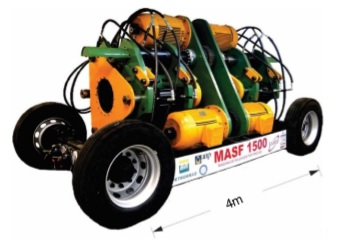
Image of the machine from research on friction welding system for pipeline steel. Unfortunately, in this case to 08.2022 only one image of the machine was shared, so is difficult to deduce reality of this image. The authors of paper wher image is, mentions that this welder is for long components with an outer diameter of 220 mm and wall thickness of 8 mm, however additional tests should be performed with regard to the risk of crack and also good add safety of users and the environment if it is used for pipeline: List of pipeline accidents

Table with sample book typical parameters of the welding process.
Materials (Symbols are standardized but dependent on the region)	Diameter [mm]	Rotation speed [RPM]	Pressure [MPa]		Friction time [s]	Burn off rate [mm]
Materials (Symbols are standardized but dependent on the region)	Diameter [mm]	Rotation speed [RPM]	Friction	Forge	Friction time [s]	Burn off rate [mm]
steel S235JR + steel S235JR	40	750	80	100	11	6–6.5
steel C55 + steel C55	40	1000	100	140	15	11.1–11.4
steel 41Cr4 + steel 41Cr4	20	1000	60	120	8.5	5–5.5
steel X20Cr13 + steel X20Cr13	20	1000	100	206	6	5.5
steel OOH18M2Nb + steel OOH18M2Nb	24	1450	90	120	225	-
steel X3CrTi17 + steel X3CrTi17	35	750	50	100	8	7–7.5
steel X6CrNiTi18 + steel X6CrNiTi18	35	750	90	200	23	6.5–7.2
Aluminium + Aluminium	40	750	30	30	9	30
copper CW004A + copper CW004A	35	1500	52	150	1	8.6–9.4
steel 100Cr6 + steel C45	22	1000	50	140	7–8	5.6
steel HHS+ C55	20	1450	140	160	8	-
steel HS18-0-1 + steel C55	20	1450	140	160	10	-
steel X6CrNiTi18-10 + steel E295	40	1000	110	145	30	-
Aluminium + steel S235JR	50	400	50	120	7	15
copper CW004A + steel S195	20	1450	25	160	5.3	12

== Low Force Friction Welding ==
An improved modification of the standard friction welding is Low Force Friction Welding, hybrid technology developed by EWI and Manufacturing Technology Inc. (MTI), "uses an external energy source to raise the interface temperature of the two parts being joined, thereby reducing the process forces required to make a solid-state weld compared to traditional friction welding". The process applies to both linear and rotary friction welding.

Following the informations from the Manufacturing Technology blog and website, the technology is promising.

Low force friction advantages:

- Little or no flash,
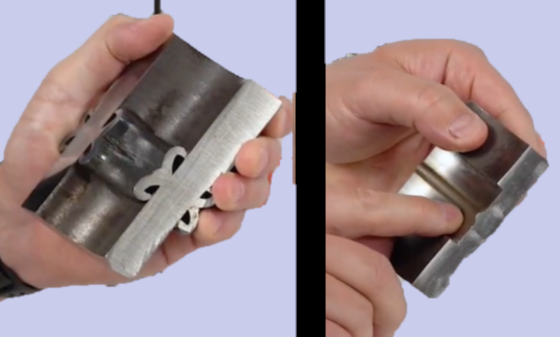
  Example of flash difference: On the left in the photo is shown flash from standard welding, on the right from low force friction welding. The welded element on the right looks correct.
- Joining of components previously limited by friction welding,

For example, those with a high melting point such as refractory metals like molybdenum, tantalum, tungsten or if there is a difference in material properties.

The manufacturer also listed same advantages, which are not fully explained, this is not true for every case:

- Reduced machine footprint, but machine must have additional heating elements.
- Reduced weld cycle time, but preheating also takes time.
- Higher orientation precision,
- Part repeatability, but this may also occur in some traditional welders if welding is repeatable.

== Construction of the welding machine ==
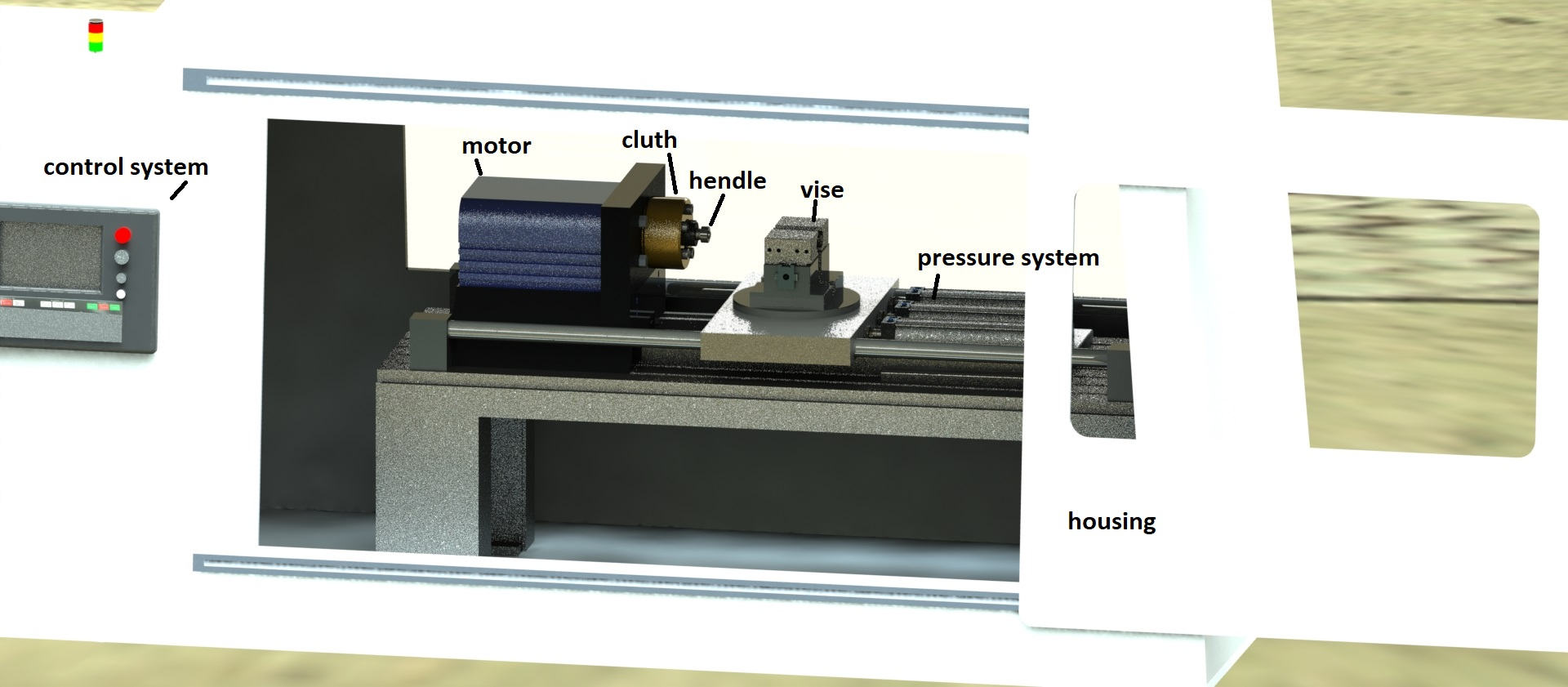
Examples of components of the RFW welding machine created in cad, however this is a simplified example for knowledge extension, so it must contain many errors.

Depending on the construction, but a standard welding machine may include the following systems:

- Control system
- Motor or motors in e.g. direct-drive welder
- Pneumatic or hydraulic pressure system
- Handle
- Non rotating vice
- Clutch in direct-drive friction welder
- Spindle
- Flywheel in inertia friction welder
- Housing
- Measuring systems

Producers present solutions and welding machines can include:

- Measurement and control dimensional systems: Active Travel Control, burn off rate measurement,
- Automation solutions, Defined angle positioning, Component lifter, Automatic door operations, Weld data export, Ready for industrial solutions, Automatic temperature control of the headstock, Monitoring of the cooling unit, servo motor control,
- Have solutions for clean environment with no arcs, sparks, smoke or flames,
- Have ergonomic workspace, nice design,
- No special foundations or power supplies are required,
- Process control and documentation systems: All process data is documented numerically and graphically, have program management, Calculated parameters - Smart machine
- HMI touchscreen panels,
- Barcode scanner for generate database of frictioned elements,
- There are optional methods qr, barcode tagging manufactured elements for example on an additional machine such as laser barcode, or tagging if it is necessary and possible,
- Flash cut off device systems on the welder, flash removal and facing, chip conveyor,
- Completely integrated solution in the specific production workflow using state of the art 3D process simulation,
  Example of: Friction welding simulation - from Otto-von-Guericke University Magdeburg Future and additional modernization in welding - but it is not easy, in addition, there is a risk of errors.
- Service assistance: Remote Service, Alarm conditions,
- Have certificates,
- Vapor extractor,
- Advanced Measurement systems,
  Fully Automated Welder Cell from MTI.ogv
- Include innovative solutions: for example hybrid technology Low Force Friction Welding, and the system associated with this technology,

However, there is not one manufacturer on the market and no one welder machine model and in addition, not always the same material and diameters is welded and a good presentation, technology description, design, may or not may determine the best solutions. There are also exist advertising presentations related to welding.

=== Workpiece handles ===
The type of chuck depends on the technology used, their construction sometimes may be similar to a lathe and milling machine.

Three-jaw chuck, multi-jaws are also used.	Exemplary handle with an ER Collets (for small diameters of workpiece).	Rotary friction welding.	Example Handles for small components: diameter~(6-14)mm used in Rotary Friction Welder machine

== Safety during friction welding ==
- Before starting the work, even if the short and basic safety regulations should be known.
- Compliance with occupational safety and health regulations
- Following the manufacturer's recommendations
- Set up the machine in a safe place: not blocking the entrance door, electric wires away from water, free movement of the users
- Recommended security systems for example: Emergency stop button, possibility of a quick stop of the machine
- Protection against touching a too hot object also it is not always visible that the object is hot - it also depends on the material being welded
- Protection against lifting to massive components

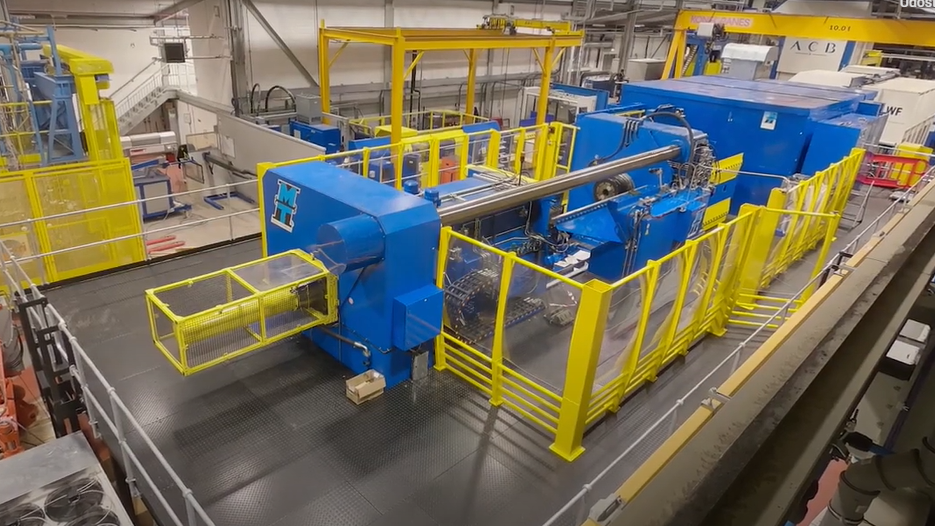
Massive welding machine.

- Caution with hot and sharp things for example the hot welded components, chips if they are cut off on the welding machine

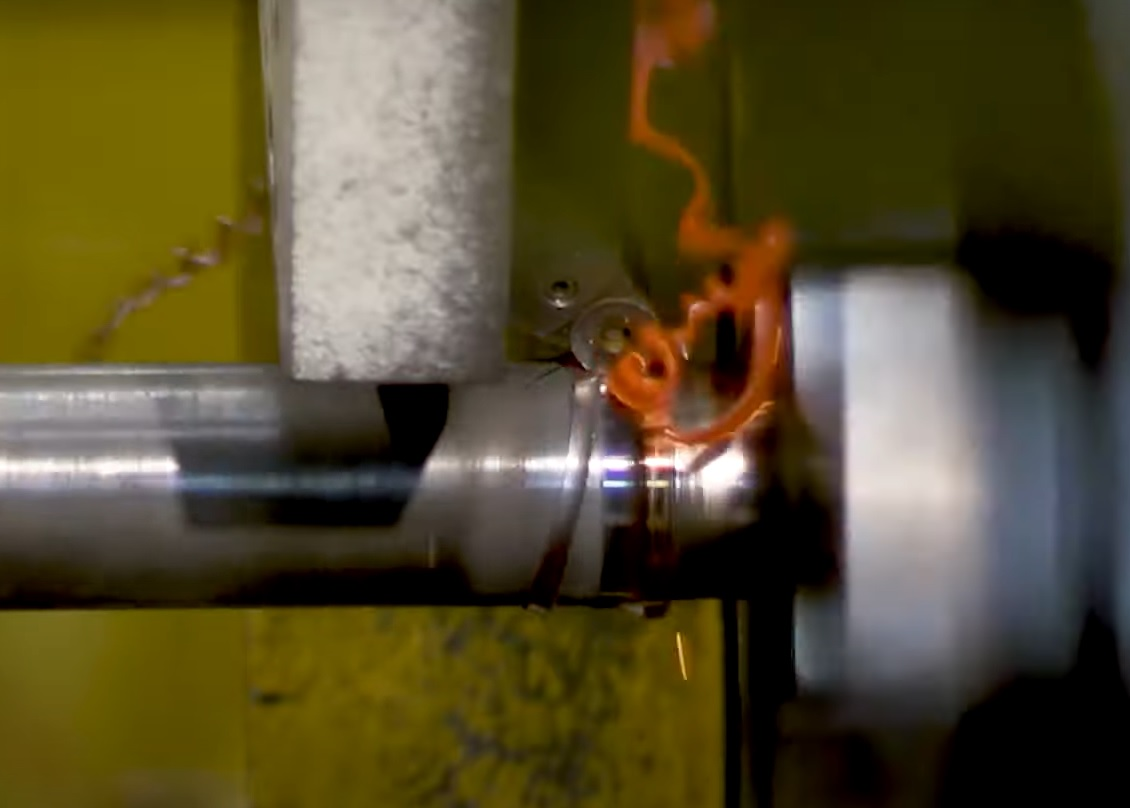
Chips -sharp edges.

- Fresh air, for example do not smoke on the production hall near the machine also in some cases vapor extractor to outside in welder

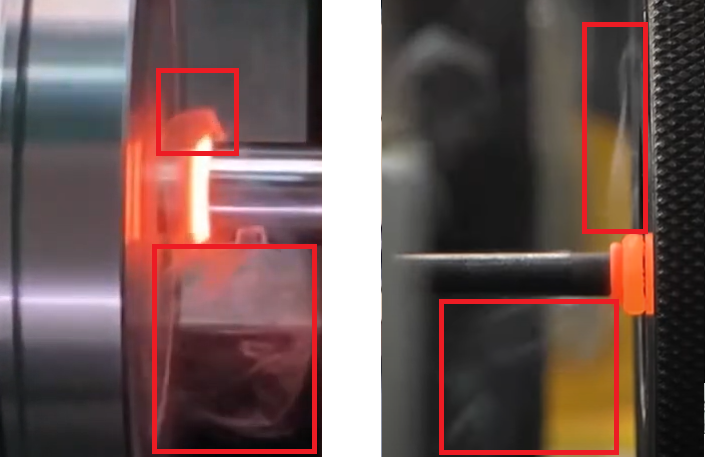
Vapors in welding and heated object.

- Covering moving components

The description of the security rules depends on the joining method and situation - access to fresh air, electrical ground, wearing protective clothing, protect the eyes is required.

However, personal protective equipment is recommended, but in some cases may be uncomfortable and in sometimes unnecessary, so protection depends on the situation.

The human factor also influences safety.

Staff negligence:

- theft for example copper grounding, because it can be sold for scrap,
- neglect of medical examinations, performed carelessly, even paided, because it's about earning money and not staff health,
- no cleaning for example because the shift time is over,
- accidents on the way to work,
- alcohol, an employee's bad day,
- spinal strains - e.g. several hours of quality control of manufactured components in a forced body position because for management workforce productivity, quality and earning money is more important than staff health,
- outsourcing - transferring responsibility to another company,
- neglect of management, because sometimes they want to only make money, they look at production, not to employees.

== Other techniques of friction welding ==
- Friction stir welding (FSW)
- Friction stir spot welding (FSSW)
- Linear friction welding (LFW)
- Research on friction welding of pipeline girth welds (FRIEX)
- Friction hydro pillar overlap processing (FHPPOW)
- Friction hydro pillar processing (FHHP)

== Terms and definitions, name shortcuts ==
Welding vs joining - Definitions depend on the author. Welding in Cambridge English dictionary means: "the activity of joining metal parts together" in Collins dictionary "the activity of uniting metal or plastic by softening with heat and hammering, or by fusion", which means that welding is related to connect. Join or joining has a similar meaning that welding and can mean the same in English dictionary means "to connect or fasten things together" but joining otherwise has many meanings for example "If roads or rivers join, they meet at a particular point". Joining opposed to welding, is a general term and there are several methods available for joining metals, including riveting, soldering, adhesive, brazing, coupling, fastening, press fit. Welding is only one type of joining process.

Solid-state weld - connect below the melting point,

welder - welding machine, but also mean a person who welds metal.

weld - the place of connection where the materials are mixed.

weldability - a measure of the ease of making a weld without errors.

interlayer - an indirect component, indirect material.

To quote ISO (the International Organization for Standardization, unfortunately the all ISO text is not free and open shared) - ISO 15620:2019(en) Welding

"axial force - force in axial direction between components to be welded,

burn-off length - loss of length during the friction phase,

burn-off rate - rate of shortening of the components during the friction welding process,

component - single item before welding,

component induced braking - reduction in rotational speed resulting from friction between the interfaces,

external braking - braking located externally reducing the rotational speed,

faying surface - surface of one component that is to be in contact with a surface of another component to form a joint,

forge force - force applied normal to the faying surfaces at the time when relative movement between the components is ceasing or has ceased,

forge burn-off length - amount by which the overall length of the components is reduced during the application of the forge force,

forge phase - interval time in the friction welding cycle between the start and finish of application of the forge force,

forge pressure - pressure (force per unit area) on the faying surfaces resulting from the axial forge force,

forge time - time for which the forge force is applied to the components,

friction force - force applied perpendicularly to the faying surfaces during the time that there is relative movement between the components,

friction phase - interval time in the friction welding cycle in which the heat necessary for making a weld is generated by relative motion and the friction forces between the components i.e. from contact of components to the start of deceleration,

friction pressure - pressure (force per unit area) on the faying surfaces resulting from the axial friction force,

friction time - time during which relative movement between the components takes place at rotational speed and under application of the friction forces,

interface - contact area developed between the faying surfaces after completion of the welding operation,

rotational speed - number of revolutions per minute of rotating component,

stick-out - distance a component sticks out from the fixture, or chuck in the direction of the mating component,

deceleration phase - interval in the friction welding cycle in which the relative motion of the components is decelerated to zero,

deceleration time - time required by the moving component to decelerate from friction speed to zero speed,

total length loss (upset) - loss of length that occurs as a result of friction welding, i.e. the sum of the burn-off length and the forge burn-off length,

total weld time - time elapsed between component contact and end of forging phase,

welding cycle - succession of operations carried out by the machine to make a weldment and return to the initial position, excluding component - handling operations,

weldment - two or more components joined by welding."

And more than that:

- RFW - Rotary friction welding
- LFW - Linear friction welding
- FSSW - Friction stir spot welding
- FRIEX - Research on friction welding of pipeline girth welds
- FHPPOW - Friction hydro pillar overlap processing
- FHHP - Friction hydro pillar processing
- LFFW - Low Force Friction Welding
- FSW - Friction stir welding
- BM - Base material
- HAZ - Heat affected zone
- PAZ - Plastically affected zone
- DRX - Dynamic recrystallization
- TMAZ - Thermo-Mechanically Affected Zone
- UFG - Ultra fine grain
- SPD - Serve plastic deformation
- HPT - High-pressure Torsion
- FEM - Finite element method
- SEM - Scanning electron microscope
- ADC - Analog-to-digital converter

== See also ==
- Welding
- Friction
- Friction welding
- Friction stir welding
- Temperature
- Heat-affected zone
- Dynamic recrystallization
- Grain boundary strengthening
- Severe plastic deformation
