= Linear vibration welding =

In linear vibration welding the materials are placed in contact and put under pressure. An external vibration force is then applied to slip the pieces relative to each other, perpendicular to the pressure being applied. The parts are vibrated through a relatively small displacement known as the amplitude, typically between 1.0 and 1.8 mm, for a frequency of vibration of 200 Hz (high frequency), or 2–4 mm at 100 Hz (low frequency), in the plane of the joint. This technique is widely used in the automotive industry, among others. A minor modification is angular friction welding, which vibrates the materials by torquing them through a small angle.

== See also ==
- Friction welding
