= Piecewise linear =

Piecewise linear may refer to:

- Piecewise linear curve, a connected sequence of line segments
- Piecewise linear function, a function whose domain can be decomposed into pieces on which the function is linear
- Piecewise linear manifold, a topological space formed by gluing together flat spaces
- Piecewise linear homeomorphism, a topological equivalence between two piecewise linear manifolds
- Piecewise linear cobordism, a cohomology theory
- Piecewise linear continuation, a method for approximating functions by piecewise linear functions
