= Quasilinear =

Quasilinear may refer to:

- Quasilinear function, a function that is both quasiconvex and quasiconcave
- Quasilinear utility, an economic utility function linear in one argument
- In complexity theory and mathematics, quasilinear time O(n (log n)^{k}), or sometimes more specifically O(n log n)
- Quasilinear equation, a type of differential equation; see Partial differential equation#Linear and nonlinear equations
- Quasi linear convective system, a line of thunderstorms, often along or ahead of a cold front
