= Friction welding =

Solid-state welding process

Friction welding (FWR) is a solid-state welding and bonding process that generates heat through mechanical friction between workpieces in relative motion to one another. The process is used with the addition of a lateral force called "upset" to plastically displace and fuse the materials. Friction welding is a solid-state welding technique similar to forge welding. Instead of a fusion welding process, friction welding is used with metals and thermoplastics in a wide variety of aviation and automotive applications.

The ISO norm of friction welding is EN ISO 15620:2019, which contains information about the basic terms, definitions, and tables of the weldability of metals and alloys.

== History ==
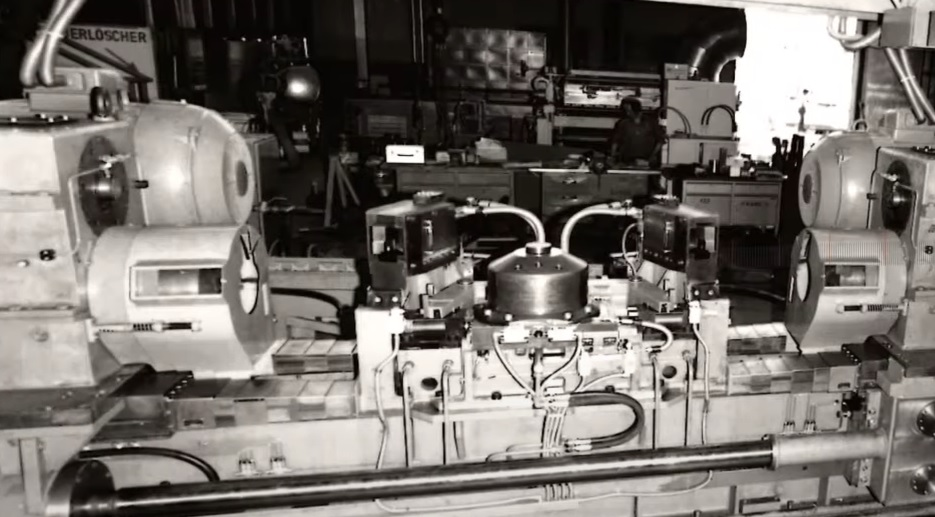
Historical photo of a double spindle machine for rotary friction welding

Some applications and patents connected with friction welding dates back to the turn of the 20th century, with rotary friction welding (RFW) being the oldest of the methods. W. Richter patented the method of linear friction welding (LFW) process in 1924 in England and 1929 in the Weimar Republic. The description of the process was vague and H. Klopstock patented the process in the Soviet Union in 1924. The first description and experiments related to rotary friction welding took place in the Soviet Union in 1956, when a machinist named A. I. Chudikov researched scientific studies and suggested the use of the welding method as a commercial process. The process was introduced to the United States in 1960. The American companies Caterpillar Tractor Company (Caterpillar - CAT), Rockwell International, and American Manufacturing Foundry all developed machines for the process. Patents were also issued throughout Europe and the Soviet Union. The first studies of friction welding in England were carried out by the Welding Institute in 1961.

In the United States, Caterpillar Inc. and Manufacturing Technology Inc. (MTI) developed an inertia process in 1962. In Europe, KUKA AG and Thompson launched rotary friction welding for industrial applications in 1966, developed a direct-drive process, and in 1974, built the rRS6 double spindle machine for heavy truck axles. Another method was invented in the Soviet Union by Yu. Klimenko in the mid-1960s and patented in 1967, experimentally proven and developed into a commercial technology at The Welding Institute (TWI) in the United Kingdom and patented again in 1991: the friction stir welding (FSW) process, is a solid-state joining process that uses a non-consumable tool to join two facing workpieces without melting the workpiece material.

An improved modification of the standard friction welding technique is low force friction welding, a hybrid technology developed by EWI and MTI, which "uses an external energy source to raise the interface temperature of the two parts being joined, thereby reducing the process forces required to make a solid-state weld compared to traditional friction welding". The process applies to both linear and rotary friction welding.

== Metal techniques ==
Friction welding takes many forms but the following are the most popular methods used.

=== Rotary friction welding ===
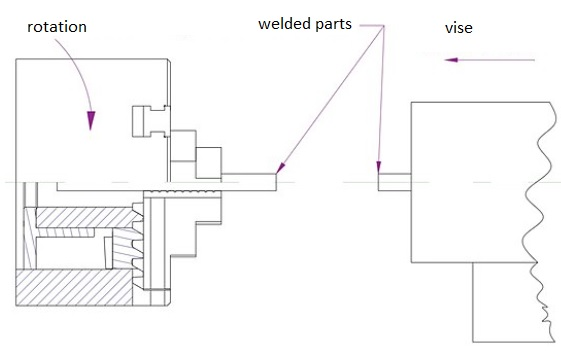
Rotary friction welding

Rotary friction welding (RFW) is one of the main methods of friction welding. One welded element is rotated relative to the other and pressed down. The heating of the material is caused by friction work and creates a non-separable weld.

=== Radial friction welding ===
Radial friction welding is a type of friction welding similar to rotary friction welding and is generally used to weld pipes together. However, unlike Rotary friction welding, it does not require either of the parts to be rotated. Instead a ring is used to generate the necessary heat by rotating it around the pipes.

=== Linear friction welding ===
Linear friction welding (LFW) is the act of moving a single component in a linear reciprocating motion across the face of a stationary component.

=== Friction stir welding ===
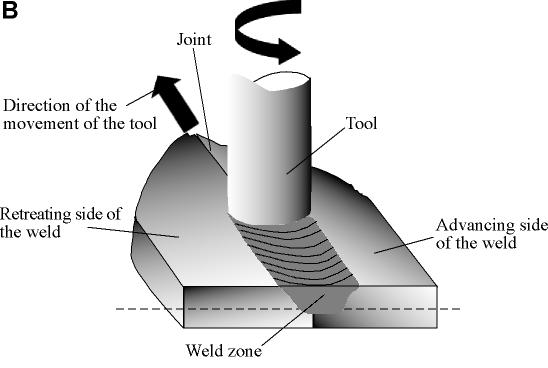
Friction stir welding

Friction stir welding (FSW) is a solid-state joining process that uses a non-consumable tool to join two facing workpieces without melting the workpiece material. Heat is generated by friction between the rotating tool and the workpiece material, which leads to a softened region near the FSW tool. While the tool is traversed along the joint line, it mechanically intermixes the two pieces of metal and forges the hot and softened metal by the mechanical pressure which is applied by the tool.

=== Friction surfacing ===
Friction surfacing is a process derived from friction welding where a coating material is applied to a substrate. A rod composed of the coating material (called a mechtrode) is rotated under pressure, generating a plasticized layer in the rod at the interface with the substrate.

== Thermoplastic technique ==
=== Linear vibration welding ===
In linear vibration welding, the materials are placed in contact and put under pressure. An external vibration force is then applied to slip the pieces relative to each other, perpendicular to the pressure being applied.

=== Orbital friction welding ===
Orbital friction welding is similar to spin welding, but uses a more complex machine to produce an orbital motion in which the moving part rotates in a small circle, much smaller than the size of the joint as a whole.

== Method list connected to friction welding ==
- Forge welding
- Friction stir welding (FSW)
- Friction stir spot welding (FSSW)
- Linear friction welding (LFW)
- Friction welding of pipeline girth welds (FRIEX)
- Friction hydro pillar overlap processing (FHPPOW)
- Friction hydro pillar processing (FHHP)
- Linear vibration welding
- Spin welding of polymers
- Low force friction welding

== Other information ==
=== Welds tests for friction welding and description of zones ===
Quality requirements of welded joints depend on the form of application, e.g. in the space or flight industry, weld errors are not allowed. Weld quality tests assurance is performed, with measurements and numerical methods.

For example, an ultra-fine grain structure of alloy or metal which is obtained by techniques such as severe plastic deformation is desirable, and not changed by the high temperature, a large heat affected zone is unnecessary.

In addition to changing the grain structure during metal joining cycles, by methods where high temperature affected zone was occur, are phase transformations structure. For example, in steel between austenite, ferrite, pearlite, bainite, cementite, and martensite, (See: Iron-carbon phase diagram). In order to avoid changes, solid state welding may be desired and large heat affected zone is not needed if weakens the material properties.

==== Heat and mechanical affected zones in friction weld ====
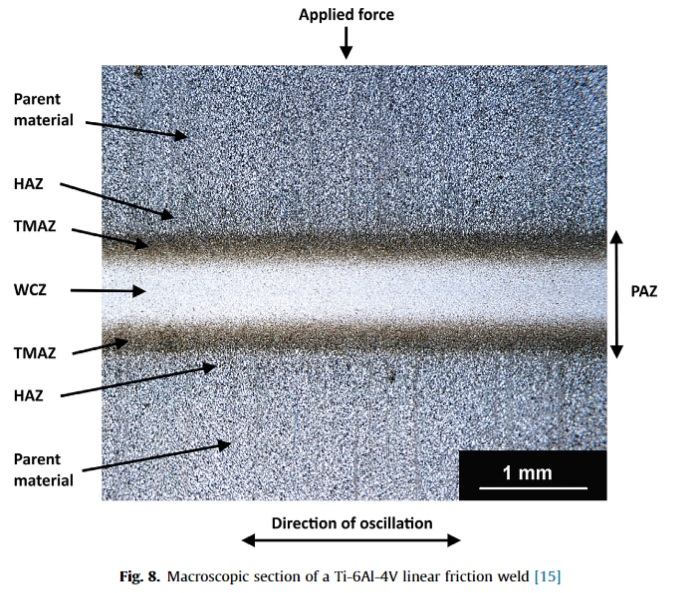
Picture shows weld zones in friction welding.

Technically, the WCZ and the TMAZ are both "thermo-mechanically affected zones"; due to the different microstructures they possess, they are often considered separately. The WCZ experiences significant dynamic recrystallisation (DRX), the TMAZ does not. The material in HAZ is not deformed mechanically but is affected by the heat. The region from one TMAZ/HAZ boundary to the other is often referred to as the "TMAZ thickness" or the plastically affected zone (PAZ).

Zones:

- WCZ– weld center zone
- HAZ – heat affected zone
- TMAZ – Thermo-mechanically affected zone
- BM – base material, parent material
- Flash

Similar terms are used in welding.

=== Seizure resistance ===
Friction welding may unintentionally occur at sliding surfaces like bearings. This happens in particular if the lubricating oil film between sliding surfaces becomes thinner than the surface roughness, which may be due to low speed, low temperature, oil starvation, excessive clearance, low viscosity of the oil, high roughness of the surfaces, or a combination thereof.

The seizure resistance is the ability of a material to resist friction welding. It is a fundamental property of bearing surfaces and in general of sliding surfaces under load.

=== Curiosities ===
- Frictional welding (micro friction stir welding) was also performed using a CNC machine. which does not mean that it is safe and recommended for the milling machine.
- Friction welding has also been shown to work on wood.
