= Linear gingival erythema =

Periodontal disorder

Linear gingival erythema (LGE) is a periodontal condition diagnosed by its distinct clinical presentation. It was initially believed to be directly associated with HIV infection, and was therefore termed HIV-associated gingivitis (HIV-G). However, subsequent research revealed that LGE can also occur in HIV-negative immunocompromised patients, and it was thus renamed.

== Presentation ==
Linear gingival erythema (LGE), previously termed HIV-associated gingivitis, is a periodontal condition characterised by a distinct 2 to 3mm band of erythema along the free gingival margin. It often affects the anterior teeth initially, with subsequent progression to the posterior teeth. Although typically asymptomatic, some individuals may experience discomfort and bleeding upon probing. LGE is frequently observed in immunosuppressed individuals, such as those with HIV/AIDS, and is believed to result from subgingival colonisation by Candida species—particularly in patients with compromised neutrophil function. This condition can serve as an indicator of immunosuppression in affected individuals.

Clinically, LGE can be distinguished from other periodontal conditions due to its unique presentation. In contrast to plaque-induced gingivitis, LGE is not significantly associated with local factors such as plaque or calculus and often persists even after professional mechanical plaque removal. Additionally, LGE does not exhibit the ulceration and necrosis characteristic of necrotising gingival diseases, which are characterised by interdental papilla destruction, severe pain and spontaneous bleeding. Its frequent association with immunocompromised states and poor response to conventional oral hygiene measures further sets it apart from other forms of gingival disease.

== Epidemiological data ==
Although more common in individuals with HIV infection, LGE has also been reported in HIV-negative immunocompromised individuals.

The prevalence of LGE among HIV-positive individuals varies widely across studies, ranging from 0% to 48%. This wide variation likely stemmed from the frequent misdiagnosis of LGE as gingivitis. A study found that 25% of HIV-positive children exhibited LGE at baseline and two-year follow-up.

There is limited data regarding the prevalence of LGE among HIV-negative individuals. However, a case report revealed the occurrence of LGE in a 13-year-old HIV-negative individual who exhibited the typical clinical signs of LGE, which were resistant to plaque-removal therapies. Microbiological investigation suggested that a Candida fungal species was the underlying cause.

LGE is commonly associated with oral candidiasis. In a study involving HIV-positive homosexual men, a statistically significant relationship was found between the presence of intraoral candidiasis and LGE: 42.9% of individuals with candidiasis exhibited LGE, compared to 12.7% of those without candidiasis.

== Potential causes and risk factors ==
=== Primary Cause: Immunosuppression ===
LGE often serves as an early marker of periodontal disease progression in HIV-positive individuals. Studies indicate that patients with LGE have reduced levels of T-lymphocytes (CD3+) and macrophages (CD68+), impairing the adaptive immune response. The compromised immune system allows opportunistic infections to thrive, increasing susceptibility to oral microbial imbalances.

Additionally, elevated proinflammatory cytokine interleukin-1 beta (IL-1β) levels have been detected in deep periodontal pockets of HIV-positive patients, exacerbating tissue destruction and gingival inflammation. The dysregulated neutrophil response in these patients further contributes to tissue breakdown and microbial overgrowth, making LGE a chronic and persistent condition in many immunocompromised individuals.

=== Microbial Dysbiosis and Opportunistic Pathogens ===
Unlike conventional gingivitis, which is predominantly associated with plaque accumulation, LGE is driven by microbial dysbiosis—a shift in the balance of the oral microbiome that favours opportunistic pathogens.

=== Candida Overgrowth ===
Recent studies have found a strong association between LGE and intraoral Candida infection. Candida species isolated from the subgingival plaque of HIV-positive individuals are genetically distinct from those on the tongue and buccal mucosa, indicating localised colonisation in periodontal pockets. It is hypothesised that HIV-positive individuals fail to adequately prime polymorphonuclear leukocytes, allowing Candida to thrive in the gingival crevice.

The presence of Candida may exacerbate LGE through direct tissue invasion or by acting as a cofactor, inducing proinflammatory cytokines that increase periodontal inflammation and attachment loss. This fungal involvement distinguishes LGE from conventional gingivitis and highlights the role of immune dysfunction in disease progression.

=== Atypical Bacteria in LGE ===
While conventional periodontal pathogens such as Porphyromonas gingivalis, Treponema denticola, and Tannerella forsythia have been detected in LGE patients, studies suggest that atypical bacterial species are also present, including:

- Mycoplasma salivarium
- Enterobacter cloacae
- Clostridium species (particularly in injecting drug users)

These bacteria are not commonly associated with periodontal disease in immunocompetent individuals but appear to colonise the subgingival environment of HIV-positive patients, contributing to inflammation and tissue breakdown. The shift in microbial composition suggests that LGE arises due to immunosuppression-driven dysbiosis rather than classical plaque accumulation.

=== Dysregulated Neutrophil Response and Inflammatory Mediators ===
Neutrophils are the first line of defense against microbial invasion in the oral cavity. However, in HIV-positive individuals, neutrophil function is dysregulated, leading to chronic inflammation rather than effective pathogen clearance.

Studies have demonstrated that LGE patients exhibit a higher percentage of neutrophils within the gingival epithelium, which may be responsible for severe gingival necrosis observed in advanced cases of HIV-associated periodontal disease. The failure of neutrophil recruitment to correlate with probing depth in HIV-positive individuals further supports the idea that immune dysregulation, rather than bacterial virulence, drives disease progression.

Additionally, studies have reported elevated levels of IgG-secreting plasma cells in LGE patients, indicating chronic antigenic stimulation due to persistent microbial challenges. This supports the hypothesis that immune dysfunction leads to sustained inflammation, which contributes to the characteristic gingival erythema seen in LGE.

== Pathophysiology ==
Linear gingival erythema (LGE), previously termed HIV-associated gingivitis, is the most common periodontal manifestation in HIV-infected individuals. However, emerging evidence suggests that LGE is not exclusive to HIV infection, as it has also been reported in immunocompromised individuals without HIV. The American Academy of Periodontology classifies LGE as a gingival disease of fungal origin, with Candida species being the primary etiological factor.

HIV leads to immunosuppression primarily through the depletion of CD4+ T lymphocytes, which are essential for coordinating the immune response. As the number of CD4+ cells declines, individuals become more susceptible to opportunistic infections, including fungal overgrowth. Studies have shown that individuals with lower CD4+ counts, particularly those with counts below 200 cells/mm^{3}, are at a significantly higher risk of developing LGE. This suggests that the immunosuppressive state caused by HIV plays a crucial role in the disease's pathogenesis.

Candida species, particularly Candida albicans, are commonly found in the oral microbiota but are usually kept in check by the immune system. However, in immunocompromised individuals, Candida can overgrow and invade oral tissues. Research has demonstrated that Candida is frequently present in the subgingival plaque of HIV-infected patients with LGE, with some studies reporting a candidal carriage rate of over 50%. The presence of Candida in LGE lesions has been further supported by antifungal treatment outcomes—patients who receive antifungal therapy often experience complete resolution of LGE, reinforcing its fungal etiology.

The mechanism by which Candida contributes to LGE involves its ability to penetrate the gingival epithelium and invade deeper tissues. Secreted aspartyl proteinases (SAPs) produced by Candida facilitate tissue invasion by breaking down extracellular matrix proteins and components of the host immune defense. Histopathological studies have confirmed increased polymorphonuclear leukocytes and immunoglobulin G in LGE lesions, which are crucial for controlling Candida infections. However, due to impaired immune function in immunocompromised individuals, the response is often inadequate, allowing persistent fungal infection and chronic inflammation.

Oral dysbiosis further exacerbates LGE. HIV-infected individuals exhibit altered oral microbiota composition, with a higher prevalence of pathogenic bacterial species such as Fusobacterium nucleatum, Porphyromonas gingivalis, Prevotella intermedia, Treponema denticola, and Aggregatibacter actinomycetemcomitans. The imbalance between commensal and pathogenic microorganisms can lead to increased inflammation and a compromised gingival barrier, allowing Candida to thrive and further contribute to LGE development.

In summary, LGE arises due to a combination of systemic immunosuppression, fungal overgrowth, and microbial dysbiosis. The depletion of CD4+ T cells in HIV-infected individuals impairs the body's ability to regulate Candida growth, leading to persistent infection and inflammation. Candida's virulence factors, such as SAPs, allow it to invade gingival tissues, triggering an immune response that is insufficient to clear the infection. The presence of a dysbiotic oral microbiome in HIV-infected individuals further promotes the progression of LGE. Given its strong association with immunosuppression, LGE serves as a potential indicator of advanced HIV disease and immune decline. LGE is the most common periodontal manifestation in HIV-infected individuals. However, emerging evidence suggests that LGE is not exclusive to HIV infection, as it has also been reported in immunocompromised individuals without HIV. The American Academy of Periodontology classifies LGE as a gingival disease of fungal origin, with Candida species being the primary etiological factor.

== Diagnosis and histopathological features ==
Diagnosing LGE primarily involves a comprehensive clinical examination. The hallmark feature is the linear, erythematous band along the gingival margin that is disproportionate to the amount of dental plaque present. Diagnostic confirmation can be achieved through microbial cultures, smears, or biopsies to detect fungal involvement.

Histopathological examination of LGE–affected gingival tissue typically reveals several characteristic features. These include atrophy of the gingival epithelium accompanied by parakeratosis, which makes the tissue more susceptible to erythema. Additionally, there is a dense infiltration of inflammatory cells, predominantly lymphocytes and plasma cells, observed in the connective tissue beneath the epithelium. Furthermore, dilated capillaries and increased vascularity are common, contributing to the pronounced redness observed clinically.

== Impacts on oral and systemic health ==
The exact prevalence rate of LGE remains unconfirmed due to inconsistent diagnostic criteria, geographic variations and study populations across countries.

Another association of LGE would be in patients undergoing organ transplant. This is due to the intake of immunosuppressant drugs, thus giving more time for fungi (particularly Candida albicans), to infiltrate, multiply, and cause damage to the gums. Based on the current literature, there is a lack of statistics concerning the global prevalence of LGE. Moreover, LGE is typically portrayed as a sign of a compromised immune system, which increases the risk of other gingival problems, such as gingival overgrowth.

A few specific signs of this condition include

- A red band 2–3 mm in width along the gingival margin
- Petechiae along the red line
- Red spots or lesions that may bleed
- Halitosis
- Tooth mobility

With consideration of the stigmata of LGE mentioned above, this will negatively affect an individual’s dental aesthetics, speech articulation, mastication, and deglutition. As a result, an individual’s quality of life will be hampered.

== Current management strategies ==
Effective management of LGE requires a combination of mechanical debridement, antimicrobial therapy, and proper oral hygiene practices [26].

Professional mechanical plaque removal of affected tissues is recommended to remove plaque and reduce microbial load. This procedure should be done with minimal pressure to avoid trauma to the tissue. However, mechanical therapy alone is not enough because LGE does not resolve with standard periodontal treatments.

=== Antimicrobial Therapy ===
- First-line treatment involves the use of antimicrobial mouth rinses. Patients are advised to rinse twice daily with a 0.12% chlorhexidine gluconate solution, which is a broad-spectrum oral antimicrobial, and patients should be recalled after two weeks to assess the healing progress.
- Due to the association between LGE with Candida species, antifungal medications such as nystatin, clotrimazole, miconazole, or fluconazole may be prescribed. These agents are generally administered by instructing the patient to swish the medication around the mouth and then spit it out. This treatment usually lasts for one to two weeks.
- In cases where LGE is resistant to topical treatments or presents with severe symptoms, systemic antibiotic therapy may be given. The choice of systemic agents should be guided by the patient's overall health status and specific microbial findings.

Proper oral hygiene practices are important. Patients should be educated on proper brushing and flossing techniques to maintain periodontal health and prevent recurrence. Regular professional cleanings and patient compliance have a significant impact on treatment outcomes.

The patient's immune system should also be evaluated. Assessing and managing underlying immunosuppression is crucial, as improving systemic health can support the resolution of LGE and reduce the likelihood of recurrence.

Regular follow-up appointments are necessary to monitor the patient's response to treatment. If healing is not observed after initial management, further evaluation and alternative treatment strategies should be considered.

The use of photodynamic therapy (PDT) has also been proposed as a potential treatment for LGE. PDT targets pathogenic microbes by generating reactive oxygen species through a light-activated photosensitiser. These reactive species can effectively eliminate microorganisms involved in periodontal inflammation. It uses a specific light wavelength along with a photosensitiser to target and destroy harmful bacteria. Photodynamic therapy has shown promising results for periodontal conditions and may serve as a non-invasive adjunctive treatment for LGE..
