= Semilinear =

Semilinear or semi-linear (literally, "half linear") may refer to:

== Mathematics ==
- Antilinear map, also called a "semilinear map"
- Semilinear order
- Semilinear map
- Semilinear set
- Semilinearity (operator theory)
- Semilinear equation, a type of differential equation which is linear in the highest order derivative(s) of the unknown function
- Various forms of "mild" nonlinearity are referred to as "semilinear"

== Other ==
- Semilinear response, physics
- Artificial neuron, also called a "semi-linear unit"
- Semi-linear resolution
- A mixture of linear and nonlinear gameplay in video games may be referred to as "semi-linear gameplay"
