= Arshad Noor Siddiquee =

Indian academic

Arshad Noor Siddiquee is a professor in the Department of Mechanical Engineering at Jamia Millia Islamia, a Central University in New Delhi, India.

== Education and career ==
He underwent his early schooling from Pt. Lajja Shanker Jha Model Higher Secondary School in Jabalpur, Madhya Pradesh, India. In 1990, he graduated with a Bachelor of Engineering (B.E.) degree in mechanical engineering from Government Engineering College, Jabalpur. He completed his Master of Technology (M.Tech.) degree in production engineering from Indian Institute of Technology Delhi (IIT Delhi) in the year 1997. Afterwards, he pursued a doctorate of philosophy (Ph.D.) from IIT Delhi, graduating in the year 2014, working on friction stir welding of stainless steel.

In the years 2005–2007, he served as assistant director at All India Council for Technical Education (AICTE), New Delhi, India. AICTE is a statutory body of the Indian government, under the aegis of ministry of human resources and development (MHRD). From 1991 to 1993, he served as a faculty in Government Engineering College Jabalpur, India. During 1998–2001, he served as a Faculty and Workshop in-charge in Caledonian College of Engineering, Oman. This college is a campus of Glasgow Caledonian University. Later, he joined as a faculty member at Jamia Millia Islamia, where he also served as the director of Centre for Innovation and deputy proctor.

In 2024, he was the Corresponding Member of American Welding Society (AWS) subcommittee on "Friction Stir Welding for Aerospace" and Member of Task Group (D17.4): "Definitions & Terminologies", of AWS subcommittee "Friction Stir Welding for Aerospace". He is a member of Industrial Engineering and Operations Management Society (IEOM).

== Research and publications ==
His research involves friction stir welding, friction stir processing, casting, and conventional welding processes. He has published ~350 peer-reviewed scientific articles and holds four patents. His patents include Universal Friction Stir Welding/Processing Tool Adapter, Cu to AISI-316 Autogenous Dissimilar Joining by Electron Beam Welding, Universal Friction Stir Welding/Processing Work Fixture, and Double Stroke Cutting Mechanism. His publications have been cited ~9,000 times as per the data on Google Scholar. Since 2021, he is in Stanford University's list of World's Top 2% Scientists. He currently holds a rank of 153,674 in this list.

His published research is about challenges in friction stir welding of aluminium alloys, magnesium alloys, and dissimilar materials. His work on tunneling and kissing bond defects during friction stir welding was published in Journal of Alloys and Compounds. Another area of his work is regarding the friction stir welding of thick alloy sections using novel tool design strategies. Additionally, he has also worked on aluminium-based in-situ composite fabrication via friction stir processing. Among dissimilar materials, he has worked on aluminium-copper welding and steel-copper welding. During his PhD, he analyzed tool wear challenges on friction stir welding of stainless steel using a tungsten-carbide tool material. Another area of his studies is the underwater friction stir welding and processing of aluminium alloys and Al-Mg-Si surface composites. In the year 2022, he ideated the long-fiber reinforced metal-matrix composites.

Some of his published books include Engineering Economics and Cost Analysis, Publisher: Pearson Education, 2013, Engineering Economy, Publisher: Pearson Education, 2012 (ISBN 978-81-317-6387-2), Engineering Drawing (with a primer on AutoCAD), 2004. Publisher: Prentice Hall of India (now, PHI Learning). 7th reprint in 2012. (Referred/Referenced Online By)., Engineering Mechanics, Publisher: Cambridge University Press (CRC Press), Engineering Materials and Their Manufacturing, Fundamentals of Computers (covering-OS, MS Office, Networking and Programming in C++). He has also published a monograph Friction Stir Welding: Dissimilar Aluminum Alloys, 2017. Publisher: CRC Press, Taylor and Francis. Some of his recent books include Composite Fabrication on Age-Hardened Alloy using Friction Stir Processing, Publisher: CRC Press Taylor and Francis, and Friction Based Additive Manufacturing Technologies, Publisher: CRC Press Taylor and Francis.

His research work has been published in Metallurgical and Materials Transactions A and Materials Science and Engineering A., He has served as an editor for the SCI journal International Journal of Engineering and Industries (PLOS ONE) and as an associate editor for Transactions on Intelligent Welding Manufacturing, a Springer series.

== Honours and awards ==
- "Outstanding Professor Award", by Industrial Engineering and Operations Management Society (IEOM), Michigan, USA, in 2023.
- "Innovation and Entrepreneurship Award" by Industrial Engineering and Operations Management Society (IEOM), Michigan, USA, in 2021.
