= William Arbegast =

American metallurgist (1951–2009)

- Born: April 11, 1951; Davenport, Iowa, U.S.
- Died: November 28, 2009 (aged 58); Rapid City, South Dakota, US
- Education: Colorado School of Mines (BS)
- Occupations: Metallurgical engineer, mechanical engineer

William John Arbegast, Jr. (April 11, 1951 – 28 November 28, 2009) was an American metallurgical engineer, mechanical engineer and friction stir welding expert.

== Life and career ==
Arbegast was born in Davenport, Iowa, the son of William John Arbegast, Sr. and Gloria Florence Arbegast, née Kamps. He had two daughters, Leanne Stover and Kati Patterson, while he was married to Christine Arbegast. He was also known as Bill Arbegast.

He obtained his BS in Metallurgical Engineering from the Colorado School of Mines in Golden, Colorado. In 1974, he became Quality Laboratory Metallurgist for Martin Marietta Astronautics in Denver, Colorado, where he assessed metals and non-metals of the Titan Launch Vehicle and the Space Shuttle. There he was a specialist for the application of the following processes in the manufacture of aerospace components:

- heat treatment
- welding
- chemical milling
- non-destructive evaluation
- machining

Subsequently, Arbegast worked as Supervisor and Lead Engineer of the Material Engineering Testing Laboratory at Martin Marietta, where he focused on testing various structural and propellant materials. He investigated for instance the formability and weldability of a recently developed metastable beta titanium alloy (Ti-15V-3Cr-3Al-3Sn) and the fracture toughness and fatigue crack growth rates in titanium castings (Ti-6Al-4V) and aluminum based metal matrix composites (6061-17%SiC).

He was the Lead Materials and Processes Engineer for the MX (Missile-eXperimental) LGM-118 Peacekeeper program, where he looked after designs, materials and processes of contractors and subcontractors. At that time, he was also Chairman of the Non-destructive Inspection Review Board for flight and ground hardware. He was the Deputy Manager of Research and Technology for Space Launch Vehicle Systems at interfaces with the Department of Defense, NASA and other Martin Marietta divisions.

He left Martin Marietta in 1990 and obtained an advanced degree in Metallurgy and Materials Sciences at the Colorado School of Mines in Golden, Colorado, where he developed a method to add alumino-silicate fibers to silicon nitride ceramics through a flocculation and sedimentation method, followed by hot isostatic pressing of the pre-forms.

In 1996, Bill Arbegast went back to the former Martin Marietta company in Denver, which had been named Lockheed Martin Space Systems in the meantime. There he implemented friction stir welding for the Evolved Expendable Launch Vehicle (EELV). In the same year, he took a position at the Michoud Assembly Facility of Lockheed Martin Space Systems in New Orleans. There he worked on the industrial application of friction stir welding in the manufacture of the External Tank for the Space Shuttle from the high-strength aluminium alloy 2219 and the very lightweight aluminium-lithium-alloy AA2195, which cannot be welded by conventional fusion welding methods.

He also worked on friction stir welding of prototype cargo floor assemblies of the Lockheed C-130 Hercules military transport aircraft and the qualification of these structures. In collaboration with the Air Force Research Laboratory and the University of South Carolina designed and fabricated an aircraft wing-box assembly for the Joint Strike Fighter by additive manufacturing using friction stir welding.

Arbegast later became the Director of the Advanced Materials Processing and Joining Center at the South Dakota School of Mines and Technology. He also founded and directed the National Science Foundation Industry/University Cooperative Research (I/UCRC) Center for Friction Stir Processing (CFSP). The CFSP Center brings together a number of university, industry, and government partners to conduct applied research in friction stir welding and friction stir processing and was the first of its kind in the State of South Dakota. He also founded a State of South Dakota 2010 center known as the Repair, Refurbish, and Return-to-service (R3S) Center. The mission of the R3S center is to apply advanced technologies to repair and increase sustainability in aging defense systems. He was a leader in understanding material flow during the friction stir process, and his work included research in the following areas:

- friction stir welding (FSW)
- friction stir processing (FSP)
- friction stir spot welding (FSSW)
- ultrasonic spot welding (USW)
- friction stir weld repair
- laser additive manufacturing (LAM)
- friction stir joining of thermoplastics
- supersonic cold spray (SCS)
- pulsed gas metal arc welding (GMAW or MIG welding)
- virtual reality welder training

Arbegast had over 30 years industrial and academic experience in research and development of advanced materials processes. He was highly successful in project acquisition and management including developing management tools for the National Science Foundation manage an NSF I/UCRC Center. He is recognized as one of the key players in developing friction stir welding for the application within the aerospace industry. He was thus posthumously awarded an honorary doctorate of science by South Dakota School of Mines and Technology.

He died in Rapid City, South Dakota in 2009.

== Patents ==
- "Shape Memory Alloy Fastener", US Patent 5,120,175, June 9, 1992
- "Friction Stir Conduction Controller", US Patent 6,168,066, January 2, 2001
- "Method of Using Friction Stir Welding to Repair Weld Defects and to Help Avoid Weld Defects in Intersecting Welds", US Patent 6,230,957, May 15, 2001
- "Friction Stir Welding as a Rivet Replacement Technology", US Patent Application 10/217,179, August 12, 2002
- "Method for Making Large Composite Structures without Use of an Autoclave", US Patent 6,582,539
- "Apparatus and Method for Friction Stir Welding using Filler Metal", US Patent 6,543,671

== Publications ==
- Publications of William Arbegast, Website of South Dakota School of Mines & Technology Advanced Materials Processing Center
