= Dissimilar friction stir welding =

Dissimilar friction stir welding (DFSW) is the application of friction stir welding (FSW), invented in The Welding Institute (TWI) in 1991, to join different base metals including aluminum, copper, steel, titanium, magnesium and other materials. It is based on solid state welding that means there is no melting. DFSW is based on a frictional heat generated by a simple tool in order to soften the materials and stir them together using both tool rotational and tool traverse movements. In the beginning, it is mainly used for joining of aluminum base metals due to existence of solidification defects in joining them by fusion welding methods such as porosity along with thick Intermetallic compounds. DFSW is taken into account as an efficient method to join dissimilar materials in the last decade. There are many advantages for DFSW in compare with other welding methods including low-cost, user-friendly, and easy operation procedure resulting in enormous usages of friction stir welding for dissimilar joints. Welding tool, base materials, backing plate (fixture), and a milling machine are required materials and equipment for DFSW. On the other hand, other welding methods, such as Shielded Metal Arc Welding (SMAW) typically need highly professional operator as well as quite expensive equipment.

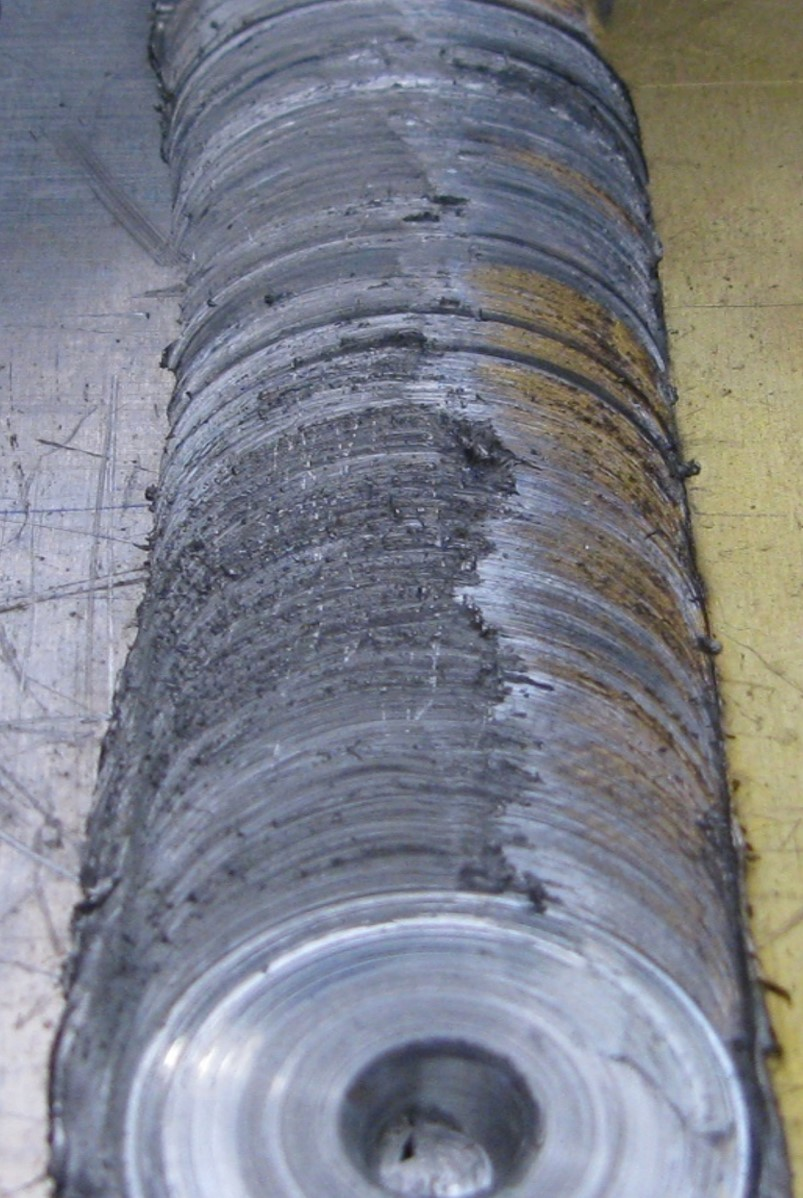
Dissimilar joint made by FSW

== Principle of operation ==
The mechanism of DFSW is very simple. A rotating tool plunges into the interface of parent metals, and heat input generated by the friction between the tool shoulder surface and top surface of the base metals lead to softening of the base materials. In other words, the rotational movement of the tool mixes and stirs the parent metals and create a softened pasty mixture. Afterwards, the tool's traverse movement along the interface creates a joint. This results in a final bond that combines both mechanical and metallurgical bonding at the interface. These two bondings are critical in order to achieve proper mechanical properties. Butt and lap designs are the most common joint types in dissimilar friction stir welding (DFSW). Likewise, one material is generally harder than the other. In general, hard and soft materials are placed in advancing and retreating sides respectively during welding.

=== Tool Geometry ===
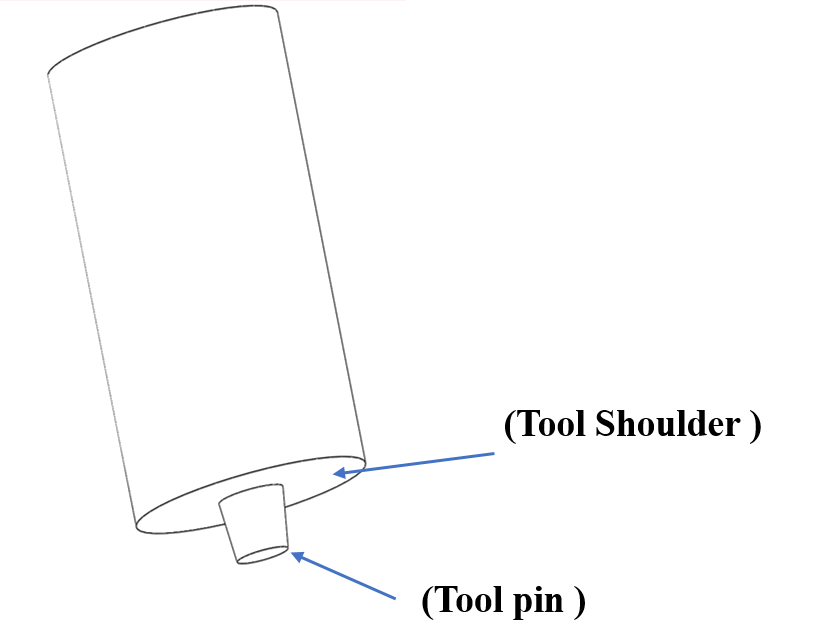
Tool configuration

Tool configuration is an important factor to achieve a sound joint. The tool consists of two parts including tool shoulder and tool pin, as shown in below figure. The tool shoulder generates frictional heat, while the tool pin stirs the softened materials. Various pin and shoulder configurations may be used for DFSW. "Cylindrical", "rectangular", "triangular" and "threaded-cylindrical" are the most common tool pin profiles, while "featureless" and "scrolled" are the most common tool shoulder configurations. Tool material selection is dependent on the base materials to be joined. For example, for aluminum/copper joints, hot working alloy steel is generally used, while for harder metals such as titanium/aluminum joints, tungsten carbide is common.

=== Welding Parameters ===
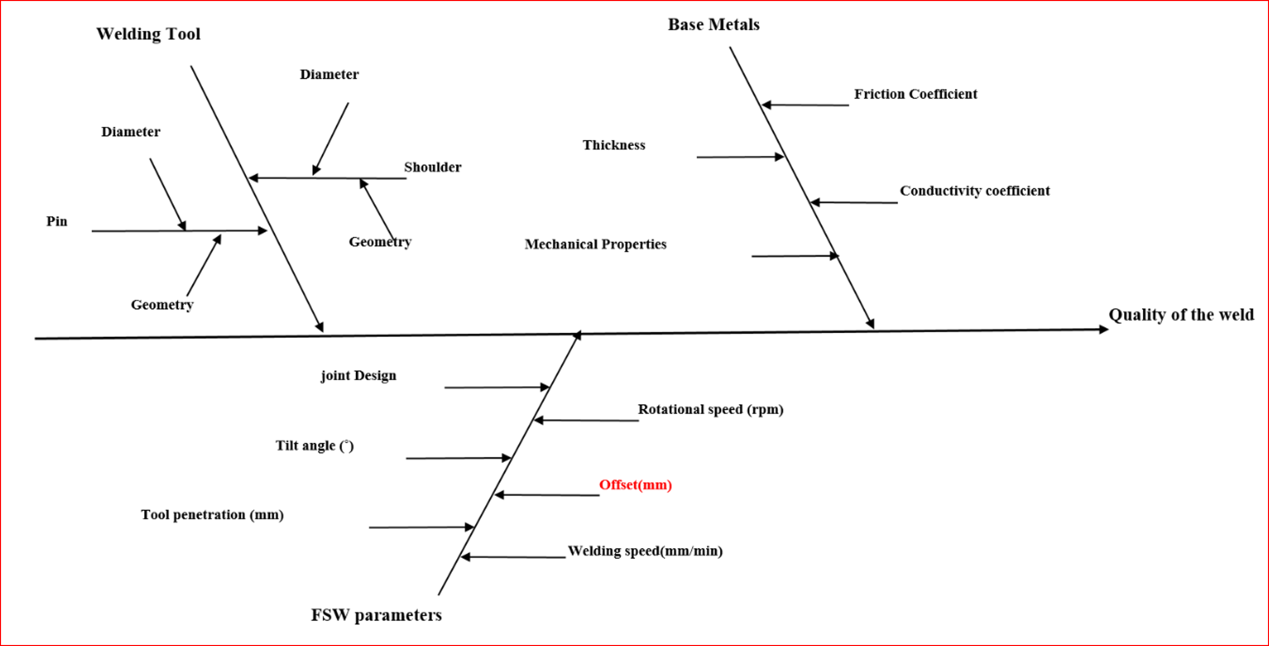
Welding Parameters

In DFSW, mechanical properties mainly include tensile strength, hardness, yield strength, elongation. Selecting optimum welding parameters results in achieving proper mechanical properties of the joint. Tool rotational speed (rpm), tool traverse speed (mm/min), tool tilt angle (degree), tool offset (mm), tool penetration (mm), and tool geometry are most important welding parameters in DFSW. The tool center is typically placed in the centerline of the joint for similar joints such as aluminum/aluminium or copper/copper joints; in contrast, it is shifted towards the softer materials in DFSW called tool offset. It is a significant factor to achieve a joint possessing smaller welding defect and higher mechanical properties. Generally, harder and softer materials are placed in Advancing Side (AS) and Retreating Side (RT) respectively. Regardless of the tool geometry, which plays a critical role on final mechanical and metallurgical properties of the weldment, the effect of the tool rotational speed and tool offset are taken into account as the most important welding parameters during DFSW.

=== Heat Generation ===
A non-consumable rotating tool is plunged into the interface of parent materials. Frictional heat arisen from the tool shoulder throughout welding plasticizes the parent materials leading to local plastic deformation of the parent materials. Localized heat generated by the tool results from following process. At the initial stage, it is primarily arisen from frictional heat between the plunged pin and parent materials. Afterwards, it is mainly produced by the frictional heat between the shoulder surface and the top-surface of base metals once the shoulder touched the top-surface. Subsequently, the softened materials are stirred together by the rotating pin resulting in a solid-state bond. Frigaard et al. showed that tool rotational speed and tool shoulder diameters are the main contributing factors in heat generation.

=== Material Flow ===
The mechanism of bonding in DFSW is based on two simple concepts. First, stirred materials, a mixture flow of soft and hard metals, is forged into the interface of harder material leading to strong mechanical bond at the interface. Furthermore, a complementary metallurgical bond is formed at the interface enhancing and improving mechanical properties of the joint. Materials flow throughout DFSW depends on various parameters including welding process parameters, tool geometry, and base materials. Tool geometry is the most important factor in achieving appropriate material flow.

== Defects ==
Occurrence of welding defects in DFSW are quite common. Welding defects in DFSW include tunneling defect, fragment defect, crack, void, surface cavity or grooves and excessive flash formation. Amongst these, tunneling defect is the most common defect in DFSW resulting from improper material flows throughout welding. It is mainly attributed to inappropriate selection of welding parameters particularly welding speed, rotational speed, tool design and tool penetration leading to either abnormal stirring or insufficient heat input. Formation of coarse fragments of harder materials within the matrix of softer materials is another typical defect observed only in DFSW. Generally, during DFSW, the paste materials behave like a metal matrix composite such that harder and softer materials act as the matrix and the reinforcement respectively. In fact, it is quite important to keep the harder material in relatively small size in order to achieve the best flow of materials. Therefore, any factors that cause formation of large piece of harder material lead to appearance of fragment defects. Tool offset and tool pin design were taken into account as the most significant contributing factors in formation of fragment defect in DFSW. They were accounted for disturbing the flow of material resulting from the formation of large pieces of harder material within the matrix of softer material due to the fact that it is quite difficult to stir and mix paste materials when one of them is not relatively fine. In addition, fragment defects usually accompany with other defects such as voids and cracks.

== Typical Characteristics ==
DFSW shows various characteristics in terms of hardness distribution, tensile strength, microstructure, formation of intermetallic compounds as well as formation of a composite structure within the stir zone. The majority of the dissimilar joints fabricated by FSW demonstrate similar results.

=== Hardness ===
Since the base materials have different mechanical properties, the hardness distribution is not homogeneous which can be attributed to two different reasons. First, different mechanical properties of base materials including the hardness causes inhomogeneity in the weldments. Second, different microstructure and grain size of the welding zones including stir zone, TMAZ, and HAZ result in various hardness. Moreover, the hardness in the nugget zone or stir zone is very inhomogenous because of the formation of onion ring (composite structure ) and IMCs. As a result, dissimilar joints shows inhomogenous distribution in the nugget zone or stir zone.

=== Microstructure ===
Four different welding zones including Stir Zone (SZ) or nugget zone, Thermo-Mechanical Affected Zone (TMAZ), Heat affected zone (HAZ) and Base Metals (BM) are typically observed in dissimilar joints made by FSW. Microstructure of the weldment demonstrates a remarkable grain refinement in the stir zone along with elongation of the grains in the TMAZ. Intensive plastic deformation risen up by tool action, rotational and traverse movements, account for the notable grain refinement in the stir zone. Moreover, HAZ presents relatively coarser grain that can be attributed to lower cooling rate in comparison with other welding areas. Some phenomena are typical in dissimilar friction stir welding including formation of Intermetallic Compounds (IMCs) and appearance of a Composite-like Structure (CS) appeared in various patterns specifically onion rings shown in below figure. IMCs and CS enhance mechanical behavior of the joints depending their conditions such as the thickness of IMCs as well as distribution pattern of composite-like structure. Proper selection of welding parameters optimizes formation of IMCs and CS resulting in the highest mechanical properties. As pointed out before, rotational speed, welding speed, and tool offset along with tool pin are the most important factors affecting on mechanical and metallurgical properties during DFSW. Unlike conventional fusion welding methods that are accompanied with substantially thick interfacial IMCs, forming an interfacial metallurgical bond during DFSW is essential to achieve a sound joint. However, it should be kept at optimum condition to enhance and improve mechanical properties i.e. it should be thin, uniform and contentious.

=== IMCs ===
IMCs are another typical phenomenon in DFSW. There existed some criteria for IMCs in order to achieve a sound joint including thickness, uniformity and continuity. The most common type of IMCs appeared in aluminum/copper joint are Al4Cu9, Al2Cu3, Al2Cu. Interface and surrounding edge of the particles dispersed in the nugget zone are two main places IMCs formed. Likewise, depending the size of the particles of harder material which dispersed in the matrix of softer material, coarse particles partially transform to IMCs mostly around the outer edge of the particles, while fine particles completely transform to IMCs. It is worth noting that the average thickness of IMCs are less than 2 micrometer. Therefore, those particles that are below than 2 micrometer are completely transform to IMCs resulting in enhancing mechanical properties of the nugget zone.

=== Tensile Strength ===
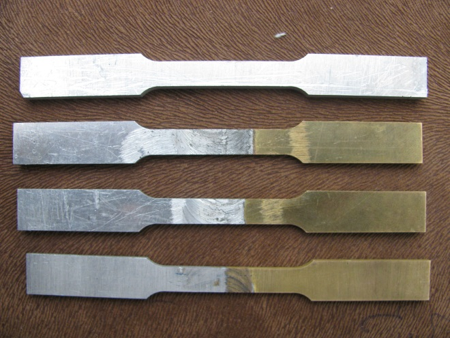
Tensile specimen

Another important characteristic in DFSW is the final tensile strength. The majority of dissimilar weldments presented similar trend in tensile strength. There are two different materials in DFSW. One is softer than the other. For example, in aluminum to copper joint, aluminum is softer than copper. What would be the tensile strength of the joint? Is it more than both? Is it less than both? What is the requirement for the sound joint? The answer is that tensile strength of the joints in DFSW are a fraction of the tensile strength of the softer material. Therefore, the final tensile strength of the weldments are usually less than tensile strength of both materials, however, in order to be acceptable in the industry, it is usually more than 70 percent of the tensile strength of the softer material. Fracture behavior of the tensile specimens shows that majority of the joints failed at the interface along with a brittle fracture. It can be attributed to IMCs developed at the interface. Although, it could successfully improve tensile strength, but the specimens showed brittle fracture which is one of the existing challenge in dissimilar joints fabricated by FSW.

=== Formation of composite structure ===
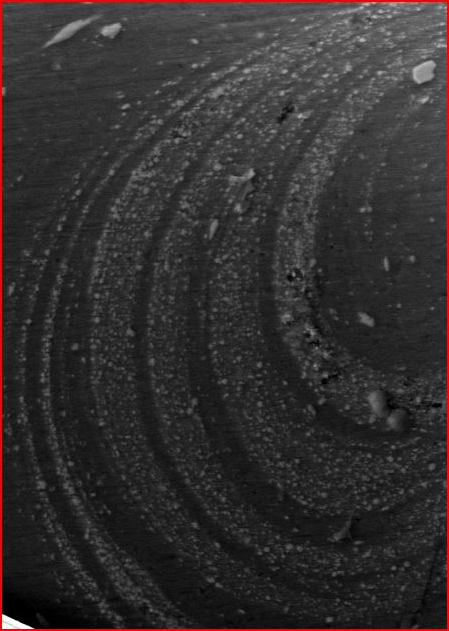
Composite structure in the form of onion ring pattern

Due to the fact that there are two different materials in DFSW; formation of a composite structure within the nugget zone is inevitable. Typically, it appears in the forming of onion ring in the nugget zone or stir zone of the softer matrix as shown in below figure. That is, fine particle of the material in the advancing side (harder material) disperse throughout the stir zone of the retreating material (Softer material). That is the main reason regarding the inhomogeneous hardness distribution in the stir zone.

== Challenge ==
FSW can be efficient method to be used in order to join dissimilar materials and the outcome in terms of tensile strength, shear strength, and hardness distribution are promising. However, most of the joints fractured at interface. Moreover, even those that have been ruptured in the base metals showed brittle behavior i.e. low elongation which can be attributed to formation of IMCs. There must a balance between tensile strength and ductility of the weldments in order to safely use dissimilar weldments in industrial applications. In other words, proper ductility and toughness are required for some industrial applications since they should possess proper resistivity against impact and shock loading. The majority of the fabricated weldments are not sufficiently strong to be used for such applications. Therefore, it is worthwhile to focus current and future works on improving toughness of the weldments along with keeping tensile strength in a proper value.
