= Pedestrian Bridge over the Petite Decharge River =

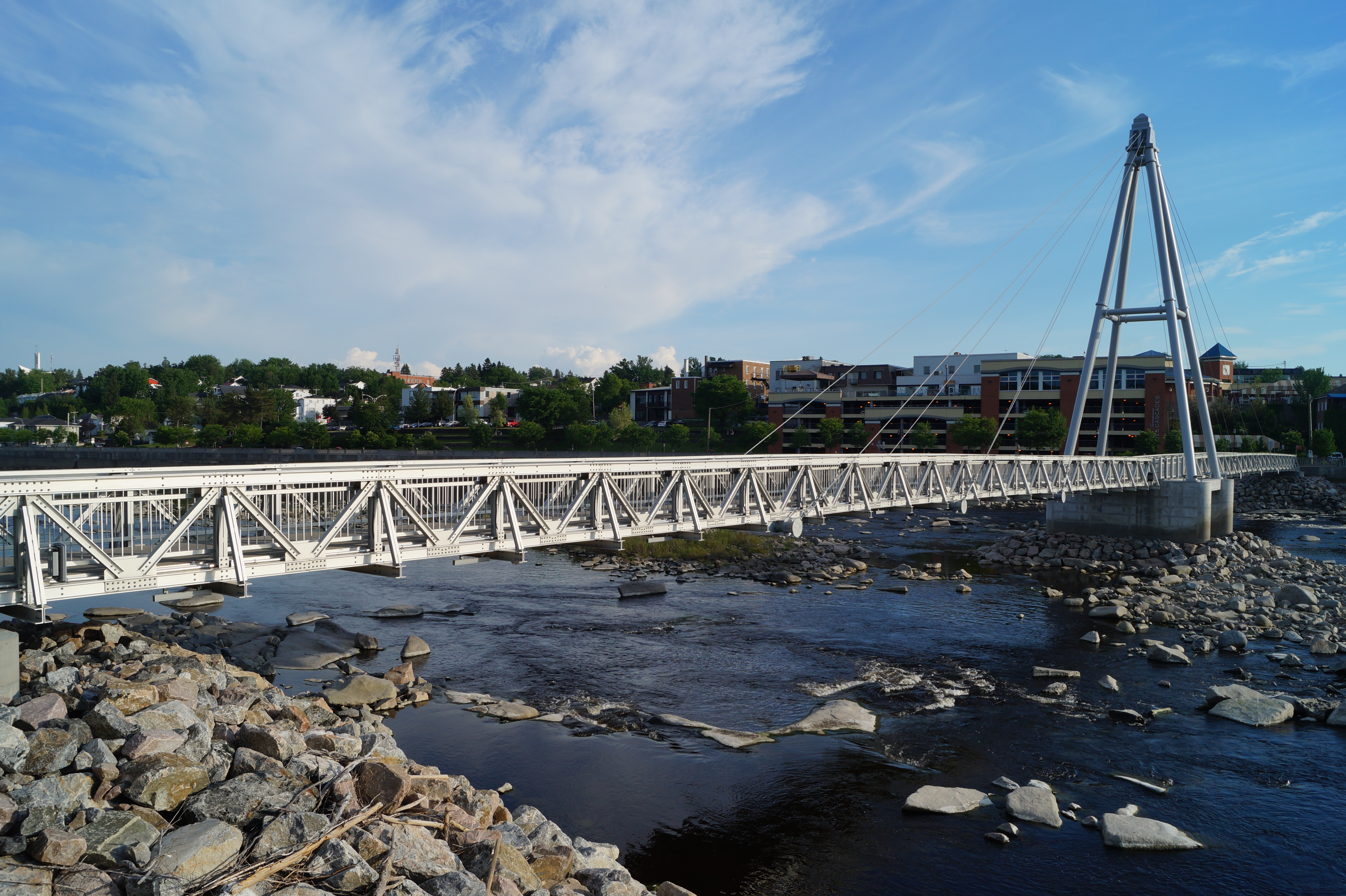
Pedestrian Bridge over the Petite Decharge River

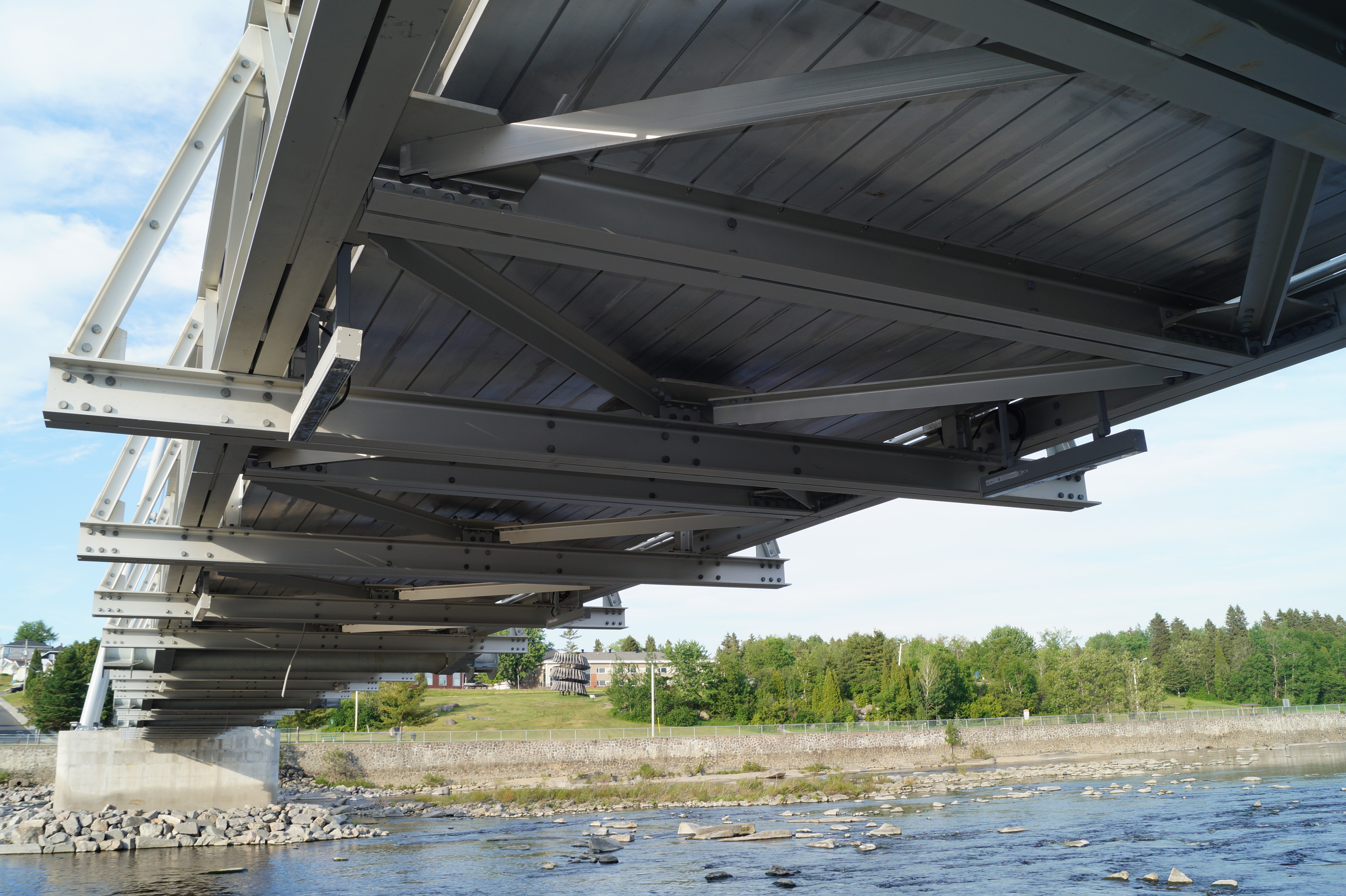
Underside of friction stir welded aluminium deck panels

The Pedestrian Bridge over the Petite Decharge River, one of the tributaries of the Saguenay River in Alma, Quebec, Canada is the first pedestrian bridge made from friction stir welded aluminium panels in Canada. The bridge was inaugurated on 29 December 2016 for the celebration of the 150th anniversary of the Town of Alma.

== Construction ==
The Pedestrian Bridge over the Petite Decharge River was commissioned by the City of Alma to replace a worn concrete bridge at the same location. The construction project was conducted by Construction Proco Inc. in Saint-Nazaire and the Quebec Metallurgy Center in Trois-Rivières in collaboration with the REGAL Aluminium Research Centre in Chicoutimi.

As requested in the tender, the bridge deck was made from prefabricated, friction stir welded aluminium panels. Ten panels with a size of 3 by 12 metres (120 by 470 in) were welded on a large friction stir welding machine in Chicoutimi from 10 hollow extrusions each. Each panel was first welded from one side, then turned around and welded from the other side. The flash was removed by manual grinding.
