= FHPP =

FHPP may refer to:

- Familial hypokalemic periodic paralysis, a rare, autosomal dominant channelopathy characterized by periodic muscle weakness or paralysis
- Friction hydro pillar processing, a solid-state joining technology
