= Aluminium joining =

Fixing pieces of aluminium together

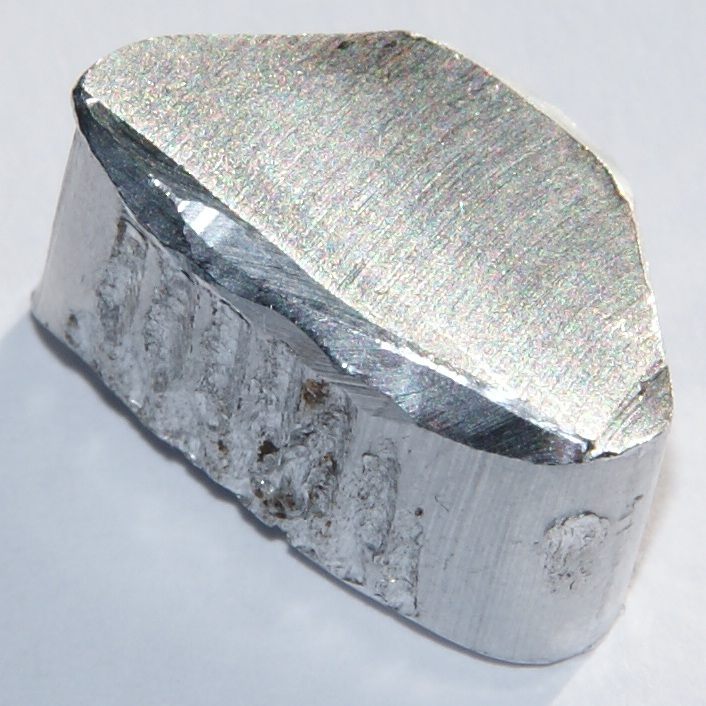

Aluminium alloys are often used due to their high strength-to-weight ratio, corrosion resistance, low cost, high thermal and electrical conductivity. There are a variety of techniques to join aluminium including mechanical fasteners, welding, adhesive bonding, brazing, soldering and friction stir welding (FSW), etc. Various techniques are used based on the cost and strength required for the joint. In addition, process combinations can be performed to provide means for difficult-to-join assemblies and to reduce certain process limitations.

== Mechanical fasteners ==
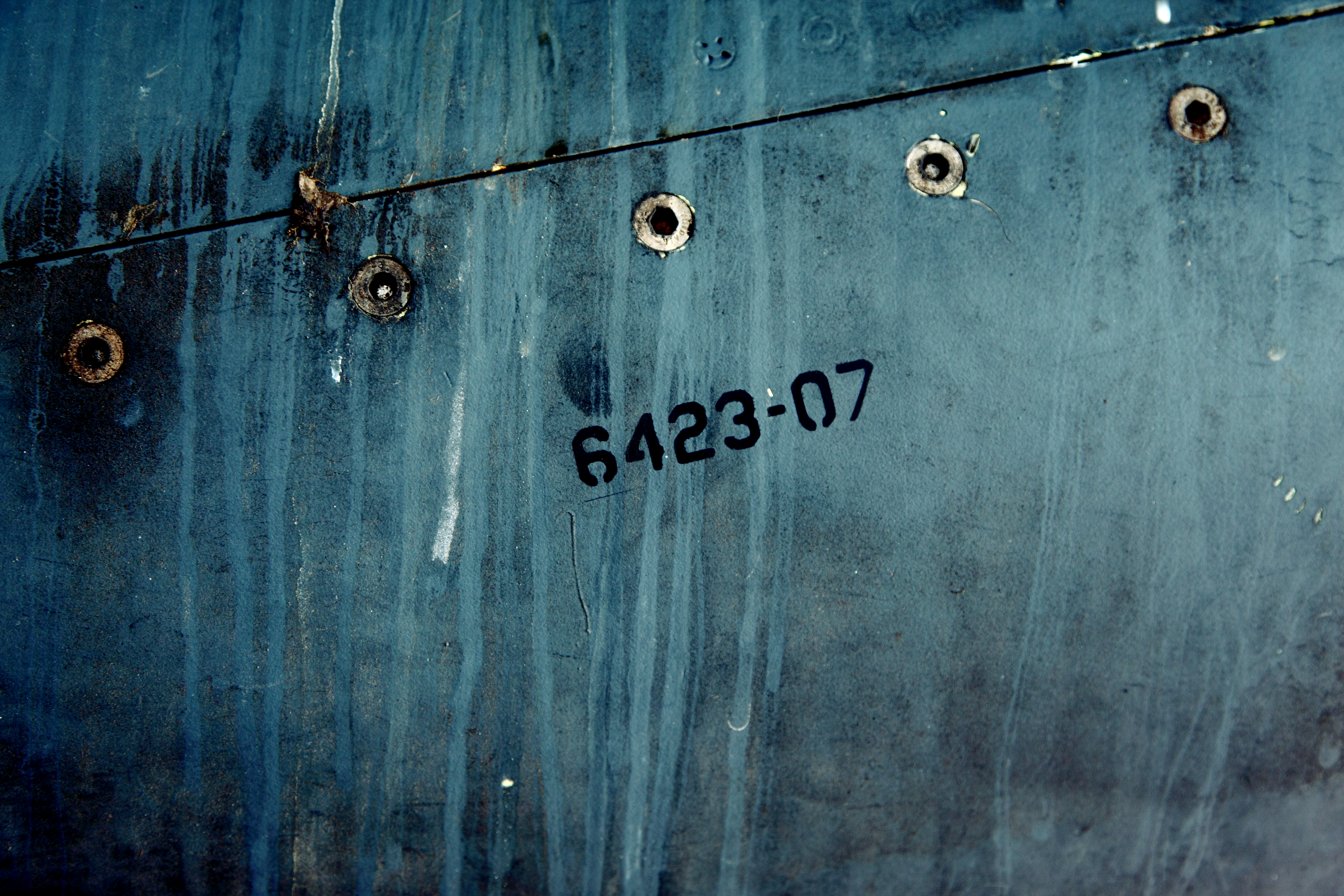
Example of aluminium aircraft panel

A simple and cheap method to join aluminium is using mechanical fasteners (i.e. bolts and nuts). Normally a hole is drilled into the base material and a fastener is placed inside. This type of joiner requires some type of overlapping material for a joint to be made. Aluminium rivets or bolts and nuts can be used; however, high-stress applications would require higher strength fastener material such as steel. This could lead to galvanic corrosion of different materials which have varying electrochemical potential. Significant corrosion would weaken the assembly over time and possibly lead to failure. In addition, different materials could result in thermal fatigue cracking from differing coefficients of thermal expansion. As the assembly is repeatedly heated stresses can build up and enlarge the mounting hole. A common place mechanical fasteners are used is riveting of aluminium panels on airplane exteriors.

== Adhesive bonding ==
Aluminium can be joined with a variety of adhesives. Aluminium may require some level of surface preparation and passivation to remove any unwanted chemical from the surface. Passivation could be as simple as rubbing alcohol or ultrasonic cleaning. Before bonding, a dry fit can confirm proper fitting of the components. Adhesives may require heat, pressure, or both during curing.

=== Surface preparation ===
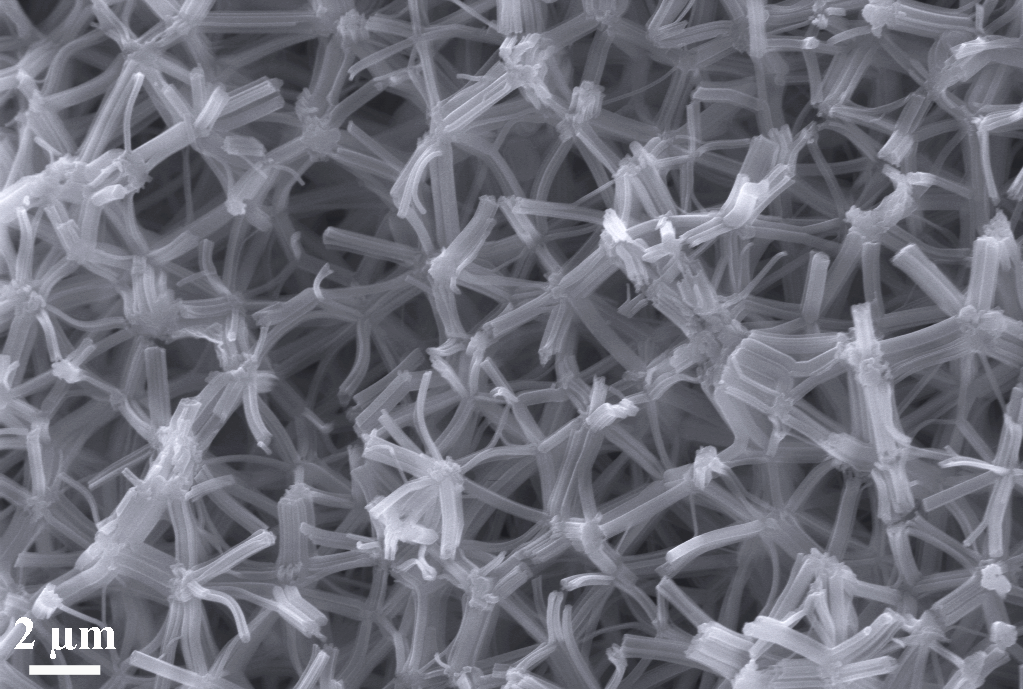
Aluminium oxide nanoparticles prepared by biopolymer mineralization

In order for a proper adhesive bond, some surface preparation is necessary. A surface cleaning to remove any impurities is made. The surface of the parts to be joined may be roughened with an abrasive such as sandpaper, providing interlocking surface asperities and increasing surface area for bonding. A chemical treatment may also be needed to increase the surface energy of the adherent and remove the oxide layer. Aluminium oxide is weakly bonded to the underlying aluminium; without oxide removal the adhesive joint is dramatically weakened. Oxide layers can separate from the metal substrate; a key principle for adhesive failure theory is Bikerman weak boundary layer. One way to strengthen the oxide layer and prevent oxide-to-substrate failure is to anodize the material, creating a strong hexagonal oxide layer with additional surface area for adhesive joining.

=== Type of adhesives ===
Adhesive selection can be dictated based on cost, strength and needed ductility. Hobbyists commonly use cyanoacrylate (super glue), epoxy, or JB Weld. Silicone may also be used in an application in which waterproofing is needed.

== Welding ==
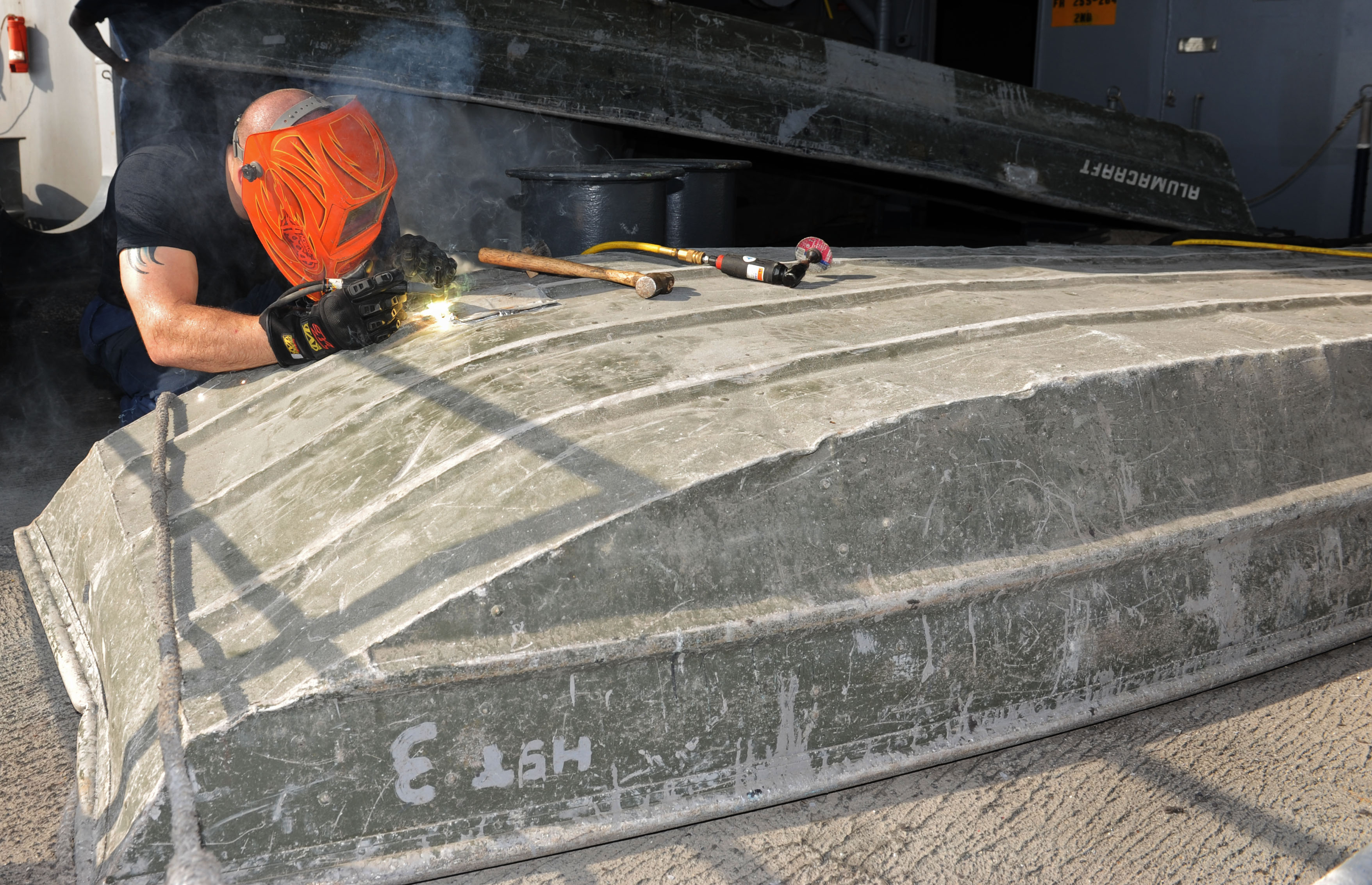
US Navy 101018-N-6362C-056 Hull Maintenance Technician 3rd Class Christopher Pizzino makes a welding repair to an aluminium boat on the fantail.

Most aluminium alloys can be joined by welding together; however, certain aircraft-grade aluminium and other special alloys are unweldable using conventional methods. Aluminium is commonly welded with gas metal arc welding (GMAW) and gas tungsten arc welding (GTAW). Due to aluminium's oxide layer, a positive polarity is needed to break up the surface to ensure a proper weld. Alternating current (AC) is also used to allow the benefits of a negative polarity which provides penetration and enough positive polarity for a containment-free weld. More details on welding parameters structural aluminium welding codes can be found in AWS D1.2.

Aluminium welding typically creates a softened region in the weld metal and heat-affected zone. Additional heat treatments may be needed to obtain a material acceptable for a specific application. Industrial welding is also commonly used in joining aluminium: friction stir welding, laser welding, and ultrasonic welding are some of the many processes used.

== Brazing and soldering ==
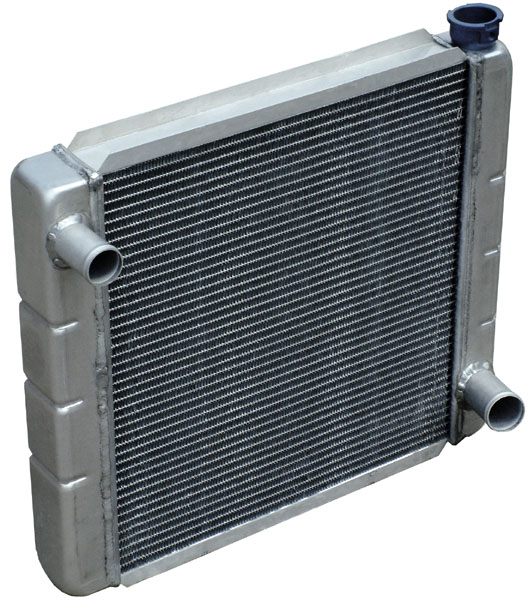
Automobile radiator joined with brazing.

Aluminium can be brazed or soldered to almost any material including concrete, ceramics, or wood. Brazing and soldering can be carried out manually or by an automated technique. Manual aluminium brazing can be difficult as there is no observable colour change before melting. As with other techniques, aluminium's strong oxide can prevent proper bonding. Strong acids and bases can be used to weaken the oxide, or aggressive fluxes may be used. Brazing alloys for aluminium must melt below aluminium's melting temperature of 660 °C. Aluminium alloys with high magnesium content can "poison" fluxes and depress the melting temperature, which can cause a weak joint. In some cases, the aluminium parts can be clad with a different material and brazed with a more common technique and filler material. Brazed joints require overlapping of parts; the amount of overlap can greatly affect the strength of the joint.

== Friction stir welding ==
Friction stir welding (FSW) is a solid-state joining process that uses a non-consumable tool to join two facing workpieces without melting the workpiece material. Heat is generated by friction between the rotating tool and the workpiece material, which leads to a softened region near the FSW tool. While the tool is traversed along the joint line, it mechanically intermixes the two pieces of metal, and forges the hot and softened metal by the mechanical pressure, which is applied by the tool, much like joining clay or dough. It was primarily used on wrought or extruded aluminium, particularly for structures which need very high weld strength.

== See also ==
- Joining technology
