= Friction stir welding =

Spinning a tool to mix metal workpieces together at the joint, without melting them

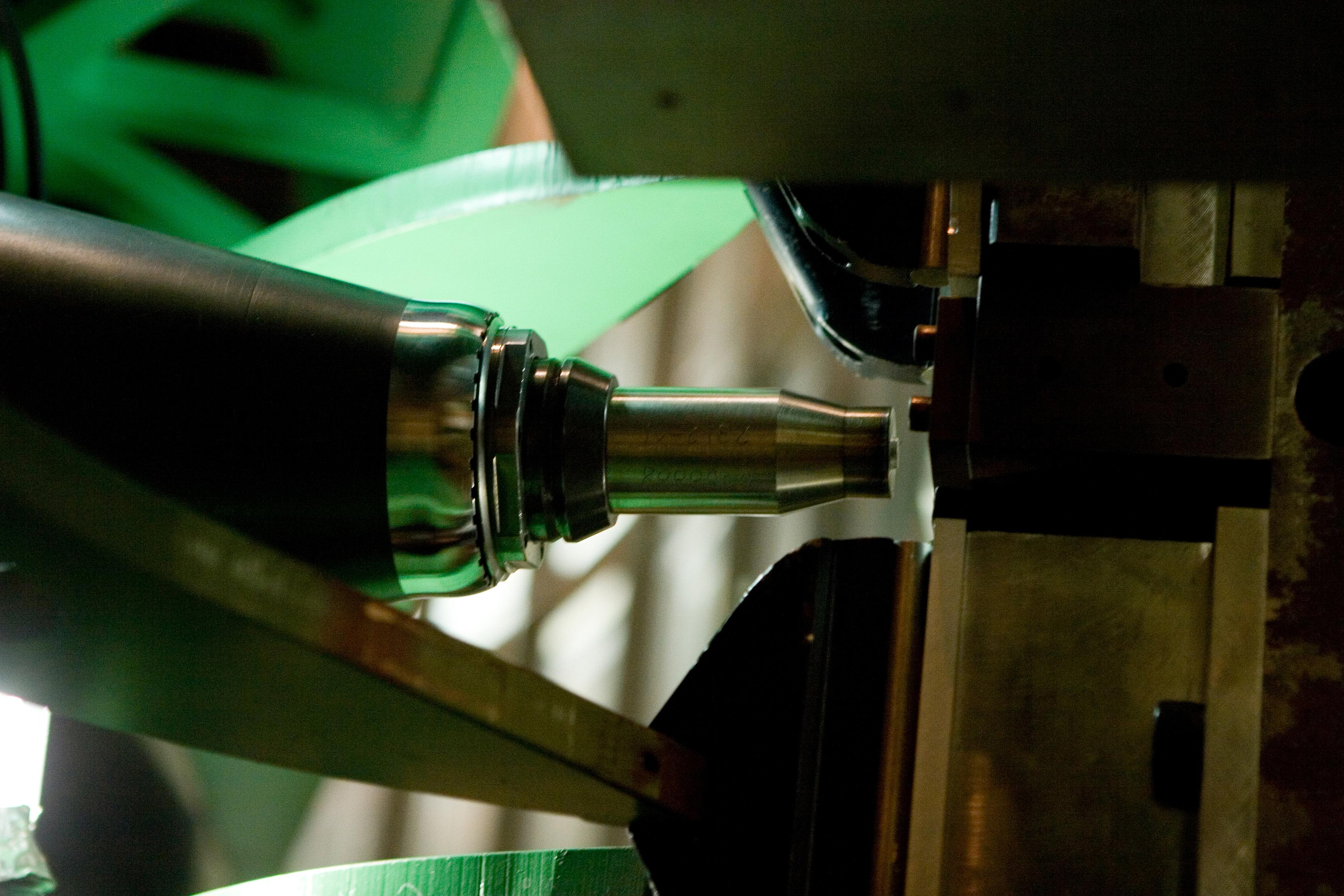
Close-up view of a friction stir weld tack tool.

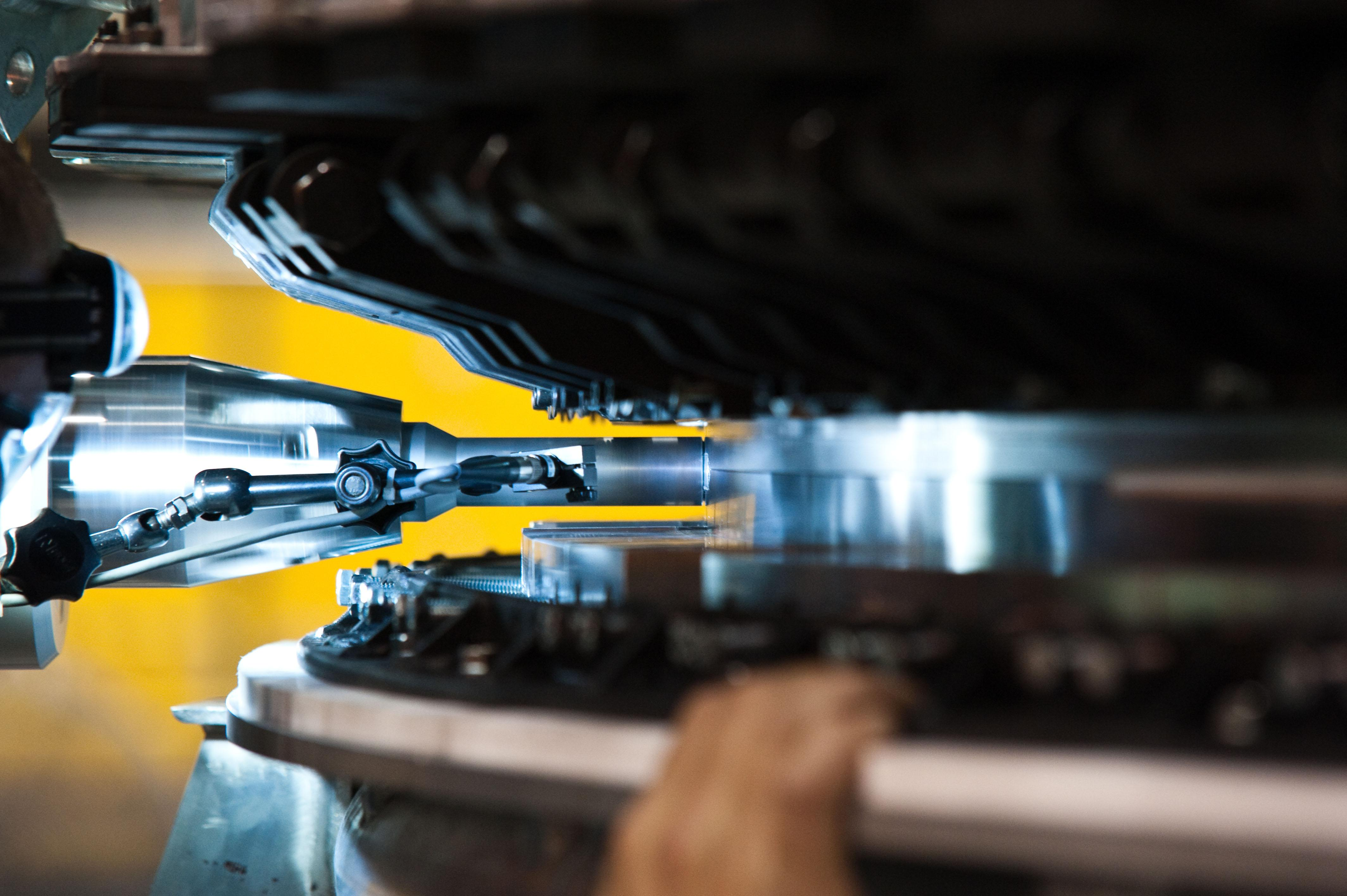
The bulkhead and nosecone of the Orion spacecraft are joined using friction stir welding.

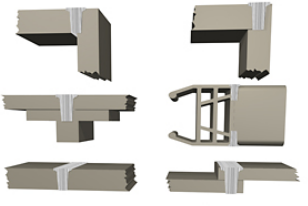
Joint designs

Friction stir welding (FSW) is a solid-state joining process that uses a non-consumable tool to join two facing workpieces without melting the workpiece material. Heat is generated by friction between the rotating tool and the workpiece material, which leads to a softened region near the FSW tool. While the tool is traversed along the joint line, it mechanically intermixes the two pieces of metal, and forges the hot and softened metal by the mechanical pressure, which is applied by the tool, much like joining clay, or dough. It is primarily used on wrought or extruded aluminium and particularly for structures which need very high weld strength. FSW is capable of joining aluminium alloys, copper alloys, titanium alloys, mild steel, stainless steel and magnesium alloys. More recently, it was successfully used in welding of polymers. In addition, joining of dissimilar metals, such as aluminium to magnesium alloys, has been recently achieved by FSW. Application of FSW can be found in modern shipbuilding, trains, and aerospace applications.

The concept was patented in the Soviet Union by Yu. Klimenko in 1967, but it wasn't developed into a commercial technology at that time. It was experimentally proven and commercialized at The Welding Institute (TWI) in the UK in 1991. TWI held patents on the process, the first being the most descriptive.

== Principle of operation ==
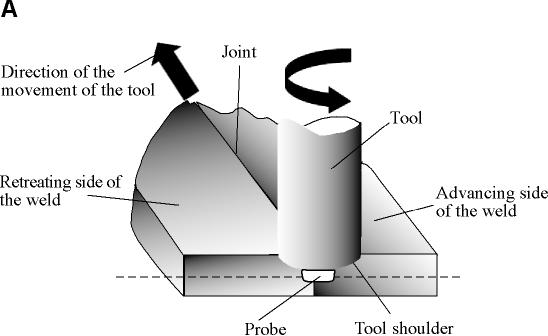
Two discrete metal workpieces butted together, along with the tool (with a probe)

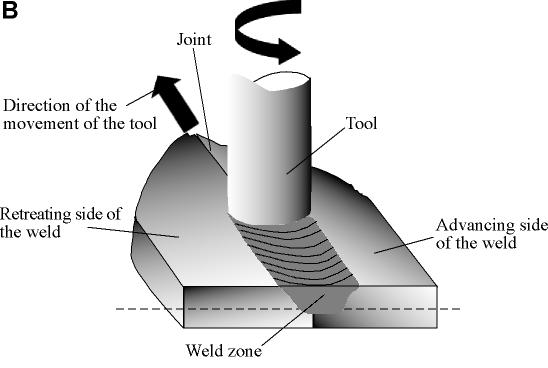
The progress of the tool through the joint, also showing the weld zone and the region affected by the tool shoulder

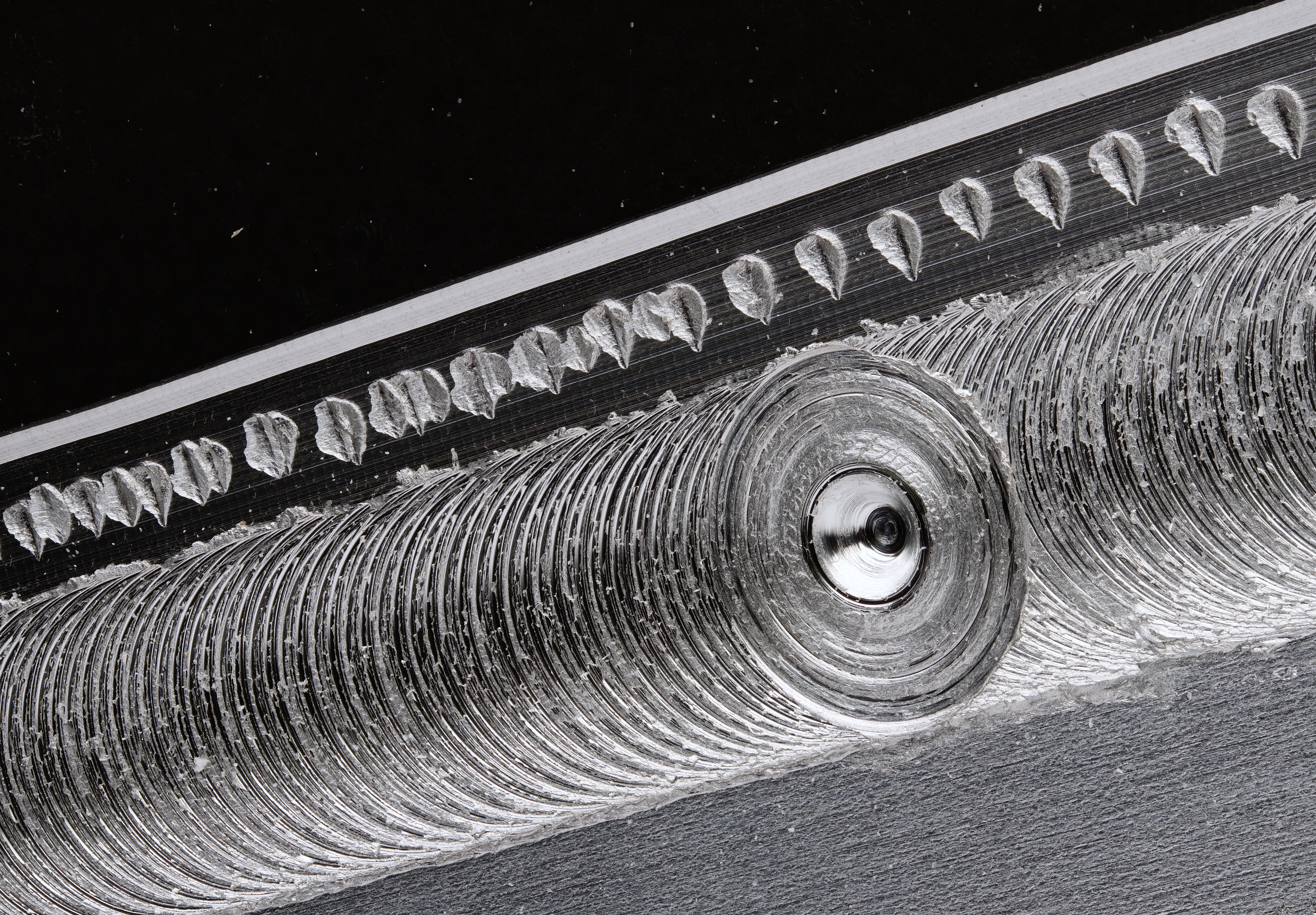
Aluminium friction stir weld with imprint of the tool where it entered/left the joint

Friction stir welding is performed with a rotating cylindrical tool which has a profiled pin (also known as a probe) having a diameter smaller than the diameter of its shoulder. During welding the tool is fed into a butt joint between two clamped workpieces, until the probe pierces into the workpiece and its shoulder touches the surface of the workpieces. The probe is slightly shorter than the weld depth required, with the tool shoulder riding atop the work surface. After a short dwell time, the tool is moved forward along the joint line at the pre-set welding speed.

Frictional heat is generated between the wear-resistant tool and the work pieces. This heat, along with that generated by the mechanical mixing process and the adiabatic heat within the material, cause the stirred materials to soften without melting. As the tool is moved forward, a special profile on the probe forces plasticised material from the leading face to the rear, where the high forces assist in a forged consolidation of the weld.

This process of the tool traversing along the weld line in a plasticised tubular shaft of metal results in severe solid-state deformation involving dynamic recrystallization of the base material.

== Micro-structural features ==
The solid-state nature of the FSW process, combined with its unusual tool shape and asymmetric speed profile, results in a highly characteristic micro-structure. The micro-structure can be broken up into the following zones:

- The stir zone (also known as the dynamically recrystallised zone) is a region of heavily deformed material that roughly corresponds to the location of the pin during welding. The grains within the stir zone are roughly equiaxed and often an order of magnitude smaller than the grains in the parent material. A unique feature of the stir zone is the common occurrence of several concentric rings, which has been referred to as an "onion-ring" structure. The precise origin of these rings has not been firmly established, although variations in particle number density, grain size and texture have all been suggested.
- The flow arm zone is on the upper surface of the weld and consists of material that is dragged by the shoulder from the retreating side of the weld, around the rear of the tool, and deposited on the advancing side.
- The thermo-mechanically affected zone (TMAZ) occurs on either side of the stir zone. In this region the strain and temperature are lower and the effect of welding on the micro-structure is correspondingly smaller. Unlike the stir zone, the micro-structure is recognizably that of the parent material, albeit significantly deformed and rotated. Although the term TMAZ technically refers to the entire deformed region, it is often used to describe any region not already covered by the terms stir zone and flow arm.
- The heat-affected zone (HAZ) is common to all welding processes. As indicated by the name, this region is subjected to a thermal cycle but is not deformed during welding. The temperatures are lower than those in the TMAZ but may still have a significant effect if the micro-structure is thermally unstable. In fact, in age-hardened aluminum alloys this region commonly exhibits the poorest mechanical properties.

== Advantages and limitations ==
The solid-state nature of FSW leads to several advantages over fusion welding methods, as problems associated with cooling from the liquid phase are avoided. Issues such as porosity, solute redistribution, solidification cracking and liquation cracking do not arise during FSW. In general, FSW has been found to produce a low concentration of defects and is very tolerant to variations in parameters and materials.

Nevertheless, FSW is associated with a number of distinctive defects if it isn't done properly. Insufficient weld temperatures, due to low rotational speeds or high traverse speeds for example, mean that the weld material is unable to accommodate the extensive deformation during welding. This may result in long, tunnel-like defects running along the weld, which may occur on the surface or subsurface. Low temperatures may also limit the forging action of the tool and so reduce the continuity of the bond between the material from each side of the weld. The light contact between the material has given rise to the name "kissing bond". This defect is particularly worrying, since it is very difficult to detect using nondestructive methods such as X-ray or ultrasonic testing. If the pin is not long enough or the tool rises out of the plate, then the interface at the bottom of the weld may not be disrupted and forged by the tool, resulting in a lack-of-penetration defect. This is essentially a notch in the material, which can be a potential source of fatigue cracks.

== Advantages ==
A number of potential advantages of FSW over conventional fusion-welding processes have been identified:

- Good mechanical properties in the as-welded condition.
- Improved safety due to the absence of toxic fumes or the spatter of molten material.
- No consumables — A threaded pin made of conventional tool steel, e.g., hardened H13, can weld over 1 km (0.6 mi) of aluminium, and no filler or gas shield is required for aluminium.
- Easily automated on simple milling machines — lower setup costs and less training.
- Can operate in all positions (horizontal, vertical, etc.), as there is no weld pool.
- Generally good weld appearance and minimal thickness under/over-matching, thus reducing the need for expensive machining after welding.
- Can use thinner materials with same joint strength.
- Low environmental impact.
- General performance and cost benefits from switching from fusion to friction.

== Disadvantages ==
However, some disadvantages of the process have been identified:

- Exit hole left when tool is withdrawn.
- Large down forces required with heavy-duty clamping necessary to hold the plates together.
- Less flexible than manual and arc processes (difficulties with thickness variations and non-linear welds).
- Often slower traverse rate than some fusion welding techniques, although this may be offset if fewer welding passes are required.
- Cost is high

== Important welding parameters ==
=== Tool design ===
The design of the tool is a critical factor, as a good tool can improve both the quality of the weld and the maximal possible welding speed.

It is desirable that the tool material be sufficiently strong, tough, and hard wearing at the welding temperature. Further, it should have a good oxidation resistance and a low thermal conductivity to minimise heat loss and thermal damage to the machinery further up the drive train. Hot-worked tool steel such as AISI H13 has proven perfectly acceptable for welding aluminium alloys within thickness ranges of 0.5–50 mm but more advanced tool materials are necessary for more demanding applications such as highly abrasive metal matrix composites or higher-melting-point materials such as steel or titanium.

Improvements in tool design have been shown to cause substantial improvements in productivity and quality. TWI has developed tools specifically designed to increase the penetration depth and thus increasing the plate thicknesses that can be successfully welded. An example is the "whorl" design that uses a tapered pin with re-entrant features or a variable-pitch thread to improve the downwards flow of material. Additional designs include the Triflute and Trivex series. The Triflute design has a complex system of three tapering, threaded re-entrant flutes that appear to increase material movement around the tool. The Trivex tools use a simpler, non-cylindrical, pin and have been found to reduce the forces acting on the tool during welding.

The majority of tools have a concave shoulder profile, which acts as an escape volume for the material displaced by the pin, prevents material from extruding out of the sides of the shoulder and maintains downwards pressure and hence good forging of the material behind the tool. The Triflute tool uses an alternative system with a series of concentric grooves machined into the surface, which are intended to produce additional movement of material in the upper layers of the weld.

Widespread commercial applications of friction stir welding process for steels and other hard alloys such as titanium alloys will require the development of cost-effective and durable tools. Material selection, design and cost are important considerations in the search for commercially useful tools for the welding of hard materials. Work is continuing to better understand the effects of tool material's composition, structure, properties and geometry on their performance, durability and cost.

=== Tool rotation and traverse speeds ===
There are two tool speeds to be considered in friction-stir welding; how fast the tool rotates and how quickly it traverses along the interface. These two parameters have considerable importance and must be chosen with care to ensure a successful and efficient welding cycle. The relationship between the rotation speed, the welding speed and the heat input during welding is complex, but in general, it can be said that increasing the rotation speed or decreasing the traverse speed will result in a hotter weld. In order to produce a successful weld, it is necessary that the material surrounding the tool is hot enough to enable the extensive plastic flow required and minimize the forces acting on the tool. If the material is too cold, then voids or other flaws may be present in the stir zone and in extreme cases the tool may break.

Excessively high heat input, on the other hand, may be detrimental to the final properties of the weld. Theoretically, this could even result in defects due to the liquation of low-melting-point phases (similar to liquation cracking in fusion welds). These competing demands lead onto the concept of a "processing window": the range of processing parameters viz. tool rotation and traverse speed, that will produce a good quality weld. Within this window the resulting weld will have a sufficiently high heat input to ensure adequate material plasticity but not so high that the weld properties are excessively deteriorated.

=== Tool tilt and plunge depth ===
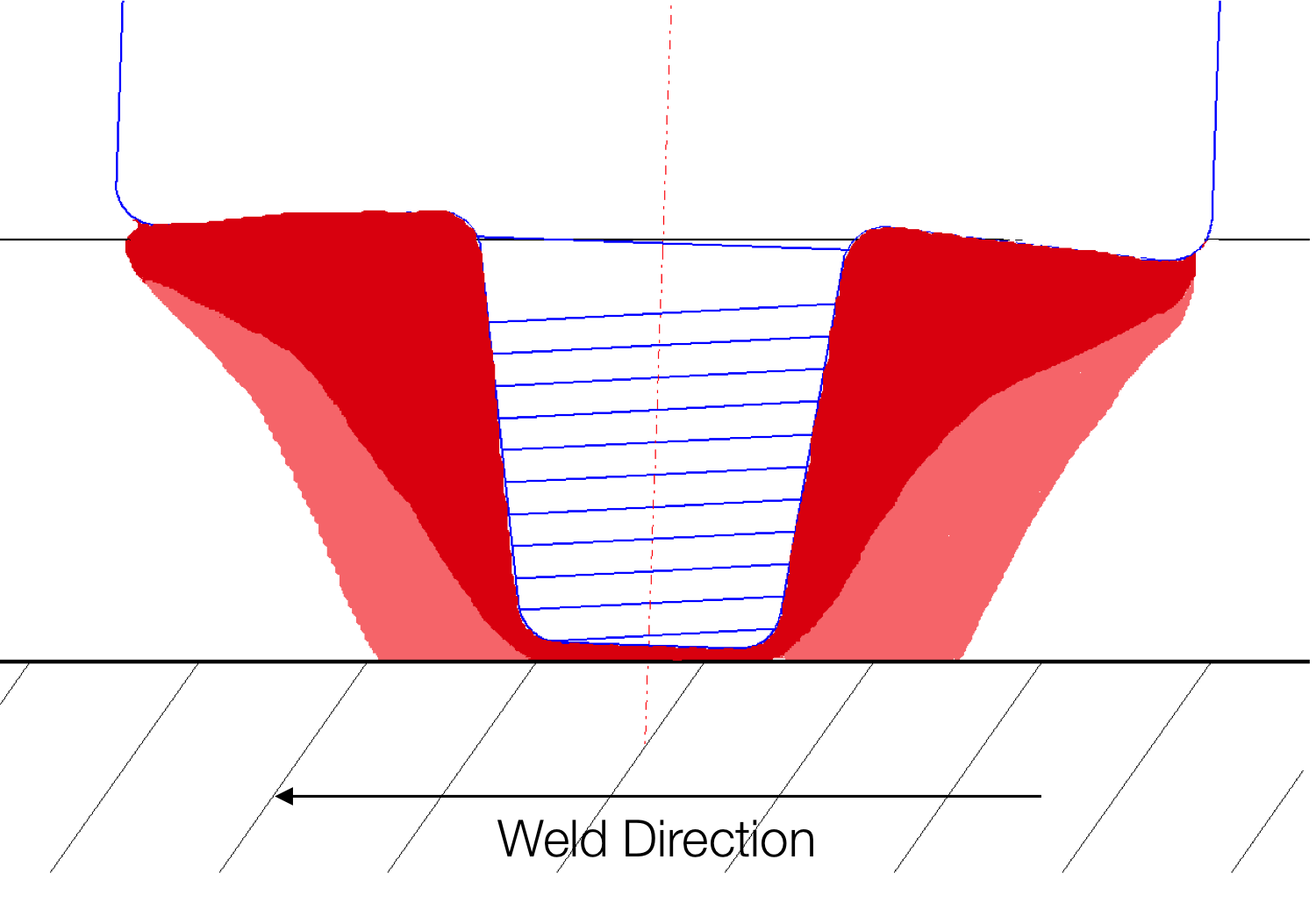
A drawing showing the plunge depth and tilt of the tool. The tool is moving to the left.

The plunge depth is defined as the depth of the lowest point of the shoulder below the surface of the welded plate and has been found to be a critical parameter for ensuring weld quality. Plunging the shoulder below the plate surface increases the pressure below the tool and helps ensure adequate forging of the material at the rear of the tool. Tilting the tool by 2–4 degrees, such that the rear of the tool is lower than the front, has been found to assist this forging process. The plunge depth needs to be correctly set, both to ensure the necessary downward pressure is achieved and to ensure that the tool fully penetrates the weld. Given the high loads required, the welding machine may deflect and so reduce the plunge depth compared to the nominal setting, which may result in flaws in the weld. On the other hand, an excessive plunge depth may result in the pin rubbing on the backing plate surface or a significant undermatch of the weld thickness compared to the base material. Variable-load welders have been developed to automatically compensate for changes in the tool displacement, while TWI have demonstrated a roller system that maintains the tool position above the weld plate.

== Welding forces ==
During welding, a number of forces will act on the tool:

- A downwards force is necessary to maintain the position of the tool at or below the material surface. Some friction-stir welding machines operate under load control, but in many cases the vertical position of the tool is preset, and so the load will vary during welding.
- The traverse force acts parallel to the tool motion and is positive in the traverse direction. Since this force arises as a result of the resistance of the material to the motion of the tool, it might be expected that this force will decrease as the temperature of the material around the tool is increased.
- The lateral force may act perpendicular to the tool traverse direction and is defined here as positive towards the advancing side of the weld.
- Torque is required to rotate the tool, the amount of which will depend on the down force and friction coefficient (sliding friction) and/or the flow strength of the material in the surrounding region (stiction).

In order to prevent tool fracture and to minimize excessive wear and tear on the tool and associated machinery, the welding cycle is modified so that the forces acting on the tool are as low as possible, and abrupt changes are avoided. In order to find the best combination of welding parameters, it is likely that a compromise must be reached, since the conditions that favour low forces (e.g. high heat input, low travel speeds) may be undesirable from the point of view of productivity and weld properties.

== Flow of material ==
Early work on the mode of material flow around the tool used inserts of a different alloy, which had a different contrast to the normal material when viewed through a microscope, in an effort to determine where material was moved as the tool passed. The data was interpreted as representing a form of in-situ extrusion, where the tool, backing plate and cold base material form the "extrusion chamber", through which the hot, plasticised material is forced. In this model the rotation of the tool draws little or no material around the front of the probe; instead, the material parts in front of the pin and passes down either side. After the material has passed the probe, the side pressure exerted by the "die" forces the material back together, and consolidation of the joint occurs, as the rear of the tool shoulder passes overhead and the large down force forges the material.

More recently, an alternative theory has been advanced that advocates considerable material movement in certain locations. This theory holds that some material does rotate around the probe, for at least one rotation, and it is this material movement that produces the "onion-ring" structure in the stir zone. The researchers used a combination of thin copper strip inserts and a "frozen pin" technique, where the tool is rapidly stopped in place. They suggested that material motion occurs by two processes:

1. Material on the advancing side of a weld enters into a zone that rotates and advances with the profiled probe. This material was very highly deformed and sloughs off behind the pin to form arc-shaped features when viewed from above (i.e. down the tool axis). It was noted that the copper entered the rotational zone around the pin, where it was broken up into fragments. These fragments were only found in the arc-shaped features of material behind the tool.
2. The lighter material came from the retreating side in front of the pin and was dragged around to the rear of the tool and filled in the gaps between the arcs of advancing side material. This material did not rotate around the pin, and the lower level of deformation resulted in a larger grain size.

The primary advantage of this explanation is that it provides a plausible explanation for the production of the onion-ring structure.

The marker technique for friction stir welding provides data on the initial and final positions of the marker in the welded material. The flow of material is then reconstructed from these positions. Detailed material flow field during friction stir welding can also be calculated from theoretical considerations based on fundamental scientific principles. Material flow calculations are routinely used in numerous engineering applications. Calculation of material flow fields in friction stir welding can be undertaken both using comprehensive numerical simulations or simple but insightful analytical equations. The comprehensive models for the calculation of material flow fields also provide important information such as geometry of the stir zone and the torque on the tool. The numerical simulations have shown the ability to correctly predict the results from marker experiments and the stir zone geometry observed in friction stir welding experiments.

== Generation and flow of heat ==
For any welding process, it is, in general, desirable to increase the travel speed and minimise the heat input, as this will increase productivity and possibly reduce the impact of welding on the mechanical properties of the weld. At the same time, it is necessary to ensure that the temperature around the tool is sufficiently high to permit adequate material flow and prevent flaws or tool damage.

When the traverse speed is increased, for a given heat input, there is less time for heat to conduct ahead of the tool, and the thermal gradients are larger. At some point the speed will be so high that the material ahead of the tool will be too cold, and the flow stress too high, to permit adequate material movement, resulting in flaws or tool fracture. If the "hot zone" is too large, then there is scope to increase the traverse speed and hence productivity.

The welding cycle can be split into several stages, during which the heat flow and thermal profile will be different:

- Dwell. The material is preheated by a stationary, rotating tool to achieve a sufficient temperature ahead of the tool to allow the traverse. This period may also include the plunge of the tool into the workpiece.
- Transient heating. When the tool begins to move, there will be a transient period where the heat production and temperature around the tool will alter in a complex manner until an essentially steady state is reached.
- Pseudo steady state. Although fluctuations in heat generation will occur, the thermal field around the tool remains effectively constant, at least on the macroscopic scale.
- Post steady state. Near the end of the weld, heat may "reflect" from the end of the plate, leading to additional heating around the tool.

Heat generation during friction-stir welding arises from two main sources: friction at the surface of the tool and the deformation of the material around the tool. The heat generation is often assumed to occur predominantly under the shoulder, due to its greater surface area, and to be equal to the power required to overcome the contact forces between the tool and the workpiece. The contact condition under the shoulder can be described by sliding friction, using a friction coefficient μ and interfacial pressure P, or sticking friction, based on the interfacial shear strength at an appropriate temperature and strain rate. Mathematical approximations for the total heat generated by the tool shoulder Q_{total} have been developed using both sliding and sticking friction models:

$Q_\text{total} = \frac{2}{3} \pi P \mu \omega \left(R_\text{shoulder}^3 - R_\text{pin}^3\right)$ (sliding)

$Q_\text{total} = \frac{2}{3} \pi \tau \omega \left(R_\text{shoulder}^3 - R_\text{pin}^3\right)$ (sticking)

where ω is the angular velocity of the tool, R_{shoulder} is the radius of the tool shoulder, and R_{pin} is that of the pin. Several other equations have been proposed to account for factors such as the pin, but the general approach remains the same.

A major difficulty in applying these equations is determining suitable values for the friction coefficient or the interfacial shear stress. The conditions under the tool are both extreme and very difficult to measure. To date, these parameters have been used as "fitting parameters", where the model works back from measured thermal data to obtain a reasonable simulated thermal field. While this approach is useful for creating process models to predict, for example, residual stresses, it is less useful for providing insights into the process itself.

== Applications ==
The FSW process has initially been patented by TWI in most industrialised countries and licensed for over 183 users. Friction stir welding and its variants – friction stir spot welding and friction stir processing – are used for the following industrial applications: shipbuilding and offshore, aerospace, automotive, rolling stock for railways, general fabrication, robotics, and computers.

=== Shipbuilding and offshore ===
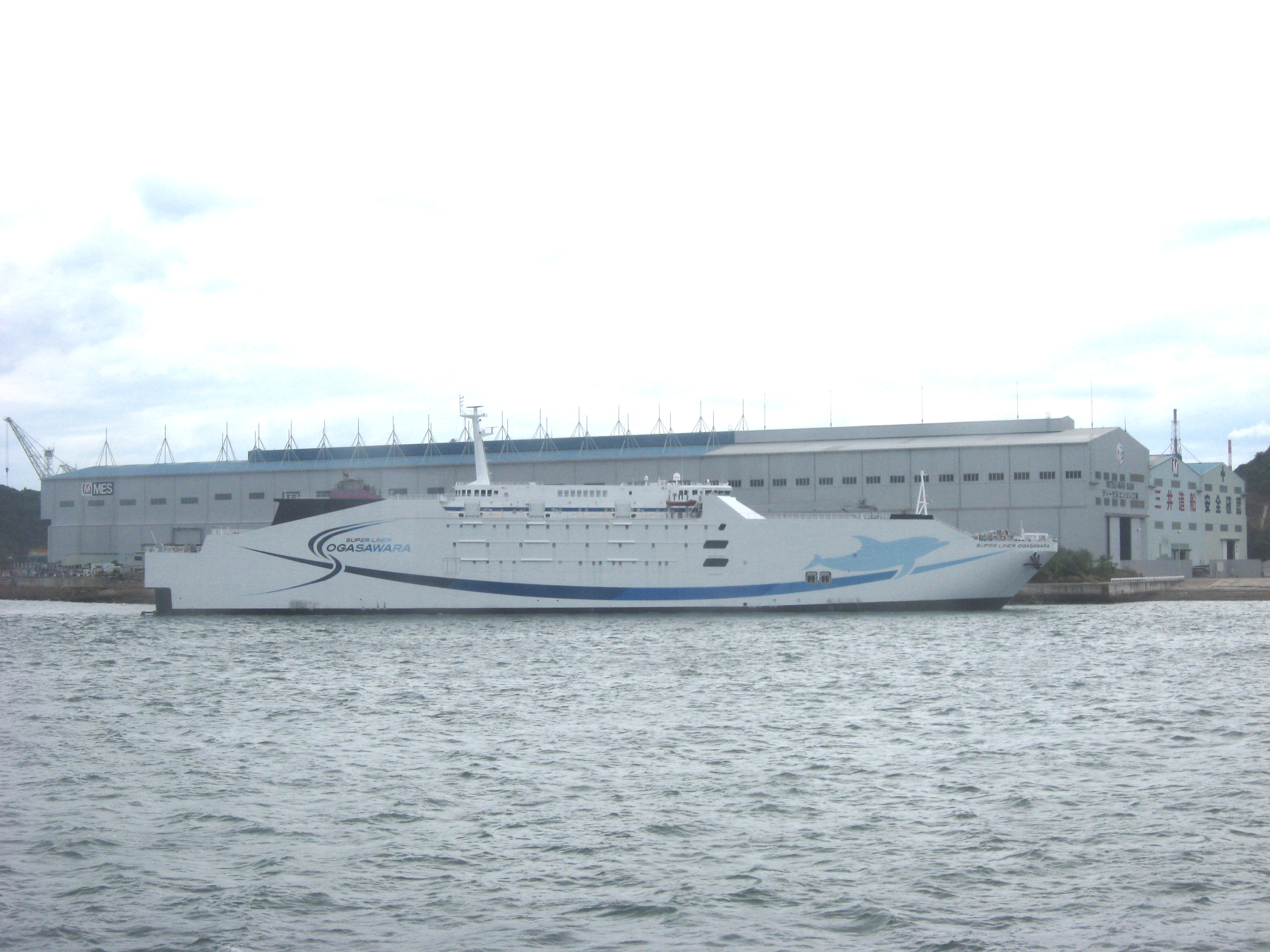
Friction stir welding was used to prefabricate the aluminium panels of the Super Liner Ogasawara at Mitsui Engineering and Shipbuilding

Two Scandinavian aluminium extrusion companies were the first to apply FSW commercially to the manufacture of fish freezer panels at Sapa in 1996, as well as deck panels and helicopter landing platforms at Marine Aluminium Aanensen. Marine Aluminium Aanensen subsequently merged with Hydro Aluminium Maritime to become Hydro Marine Aluminium. Some of these freezer panels are now produced by Riftec and Bayards. In 1997 two-dimensional friction stir welds in the hydrodynamically flared bow section of the hull of the ocean viewer vessel The Boss were produced at Research Foundation Institute with the first portable FSW machine. The Super Liner Ogasawara at Mitsui Engineering and Shipbuilding is the largest friction stir welded ship so far. The Sea Fighter of Nichols Bros and the Freedom-class Littoral Combat Ships contain prefabricated panels by the FSW fabricators Advanced Technology and Friction Stir Link, Inc. respectively. The Houbei-class missile boat has friction stir welded rocket launch containers of China Friction Stir Centre. HMNZS Rotoiti in New Zealand has FSW panels made by Donovans in a converted milling machine. Various companies apply FSW to armor plating for amphibious assault ships.

=== Aerospace ===
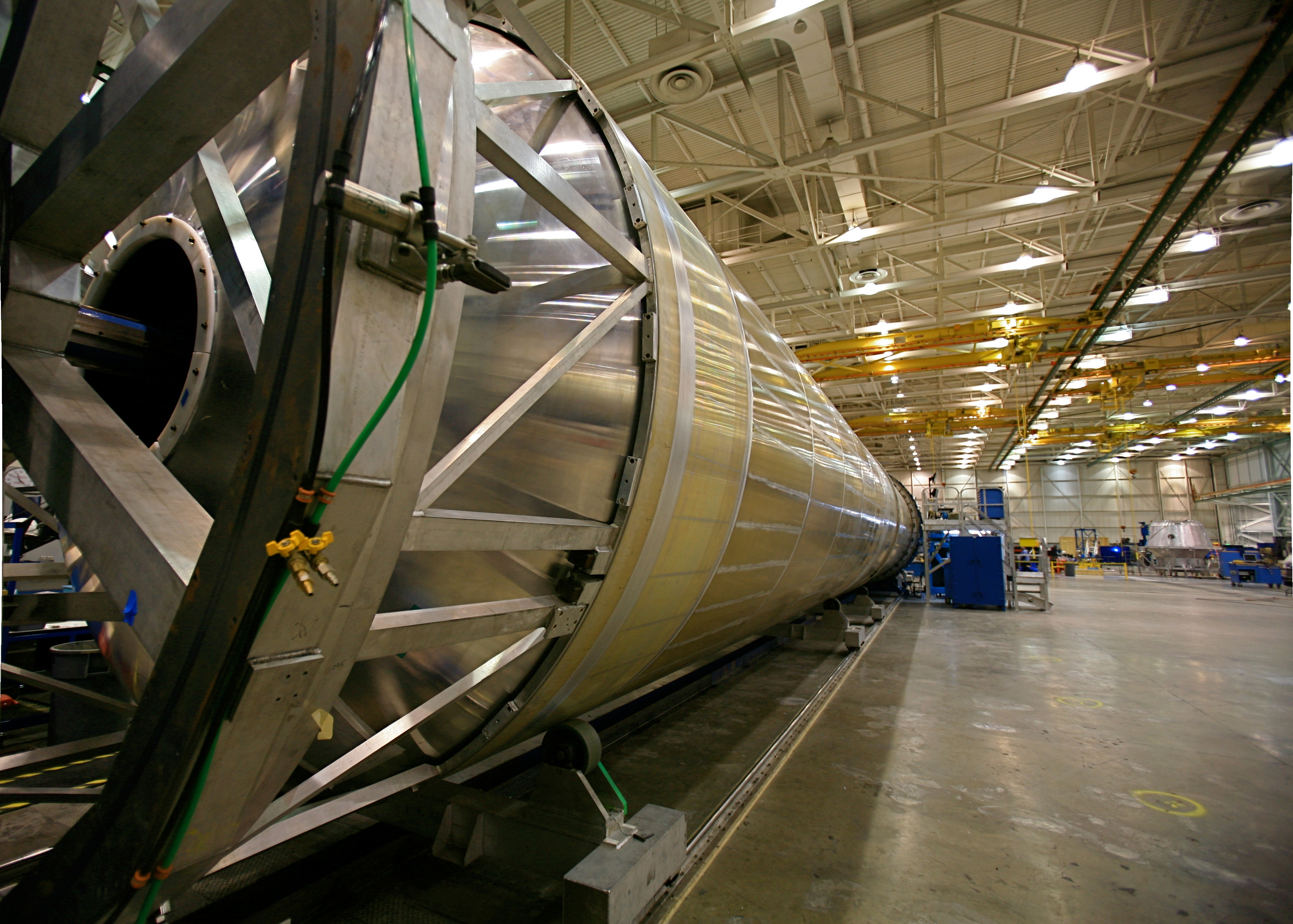
Longitudinal and circumferential friction stir welds are used for the Falcon 9 rocket booster tank at the SpaceX factory

United Launch Alliance applies FSW to the Delta II, Delta IV, Atlas V, and Vulcan launch vehicles along with their upper stages; the first of these with a friction stir welded interstage module was launched in 1999. The process was also used by NASA contractors for the Space Shuttle external tank, for Ares I until the project was canceled, for the SLS Core Stage that replaced it, and for the Orion spacecraft. SpaceX used FSW on Falcon 1 and continues to use it on Falcon 9. The toe nails for ramp of Boeing C-17 Globemaster III cargo aircraft by Advanced Joining Technologies and the cargo barrier beams for the Boeing 747 Large Cargo Freighter were the first commercially produced aircraft parts. FAA-approved wings and fuselage panels of the Eclipse 500 aircraft were made at Eclipse Aviation, and this company delivered 259 friction stir welded business jets, before they were forced into Chapter 7 liquidation. Floor panels for Airbus A400M military aircraft are now made by Pfalz Flugzeugwerke and Embraer used FSW for the Legacy 450 and 500 Jets Friction stir welding also is employed for fuselage panels on the Airbus A380. BRÖTJE-Automation uses friction stir welding for gantry production machines developed for the aerospace sector, as well as other industrial applications.

=== Automotive ===
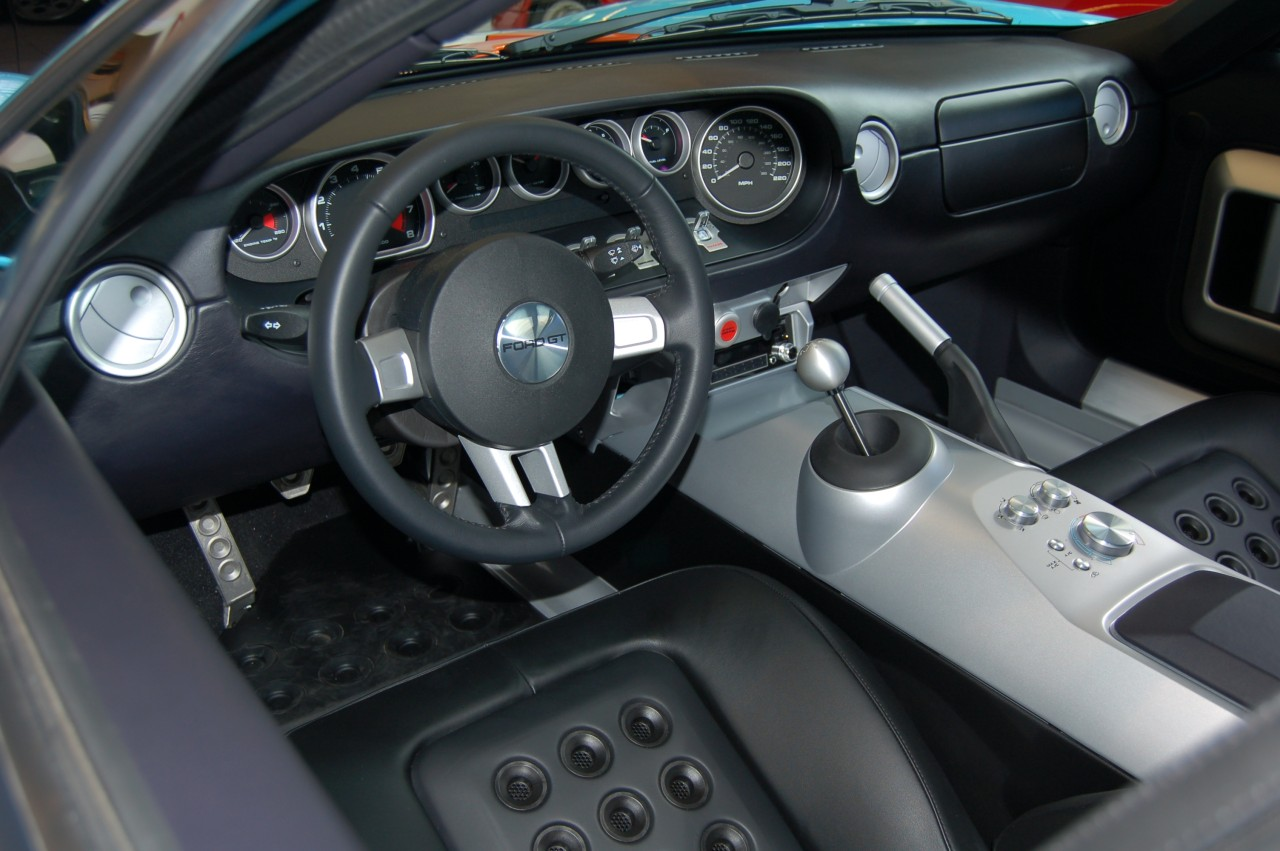
The centre tunnel of the Ford GT is made from two aluminium extrusions friction stir welded to a bent aluminium sheet and houses the fuel tank

Aluminium engine cradles and suspension struts for stretched Lincoln Town Cars were the first automotive parts that were friction stir welded at Tower Automotive, who also use the process for the engine tunnel of the Ford GT. A spin-off of this company is called Friction Stir Link, Inc. and successfully exploits the FSW process, e.g. for the flatbed trailer "Revolution" of Fontaine Trailers. In Japan FSW is applied to suspension struts at Showa Denko and for joining of aluminium sheets to galvanized steel brackets for the boot (trunk) lid of the Mazda MX-5. Friction stir spot welding is successfully used for the bonnet (hood) and rear doors of the Mazda RX-8 and the boot lid of the Toyota Prius. Wheels are friction stir welded at Simmons Wheels, UT Alloy Works and Fundo. Rear seats for the Volvo V70 are friction stir welded at Sapa, HVAC pistons at Halla Climate Control and exhaust gas recirculation coolers at Pierburg. Tailor welded blanks are friction stir welded for the Audi R8 at Riftec. The B-column of the Audi R8 Spider is friction stir welded from two extrusions at Hammerer Aluminium Industries in Austria. The front subframe of the 2013 Honda Accord was friction stir welded to join aluminum and steel halves.

=== Railways ===
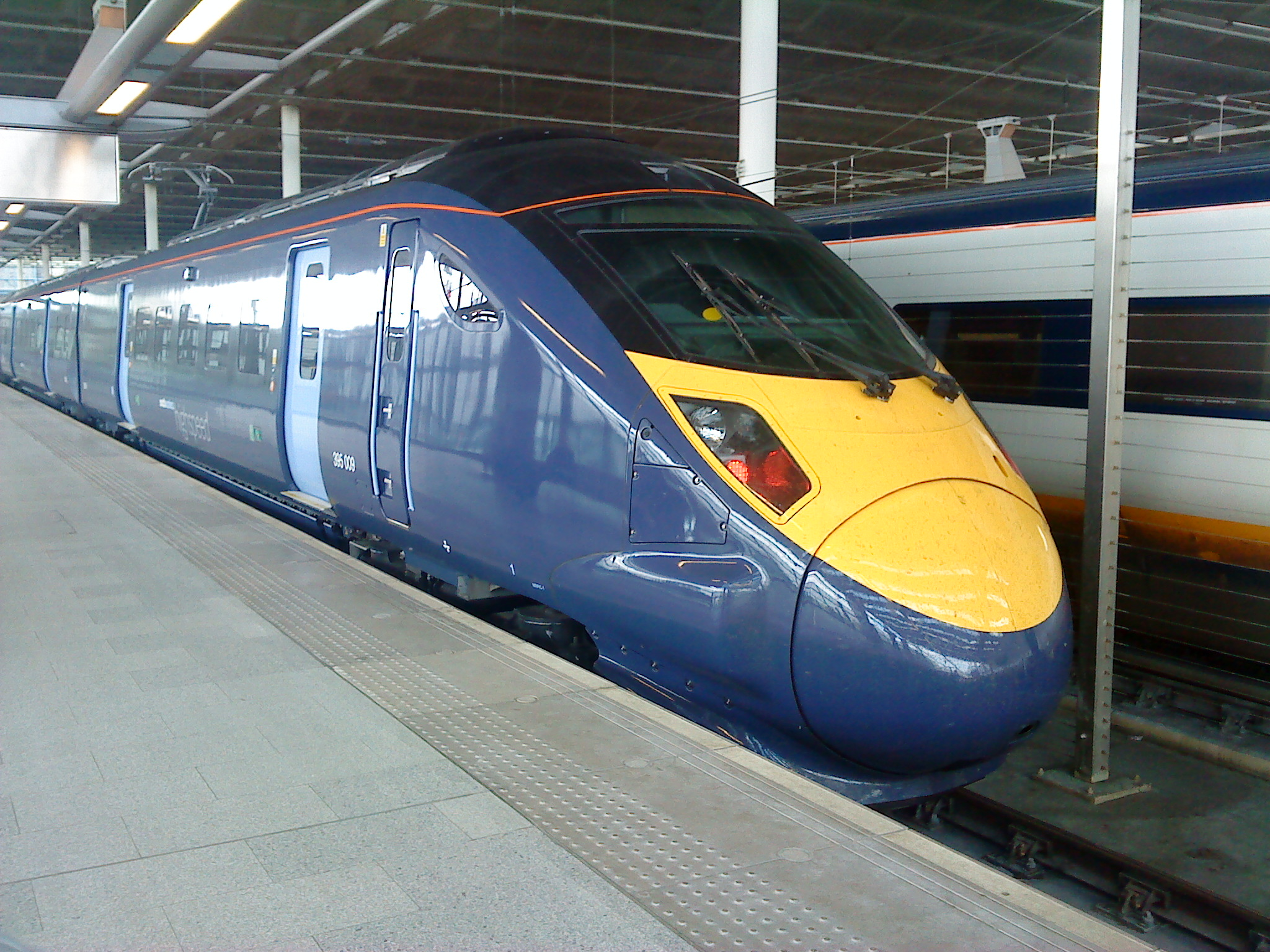
The high-strength low-distortion body of Hitachi A-train British Rail Class 395 is friction stir welded from longitudinal aluminium extrusions

Since 1997 roof panels were made from aluminium extrusions at Hydro Marine Aluminium with a 25 m long FSW machine, e.g. for DSB class SA-SD trains of Alstom LHB. Curved side and roof panels for the Victoria line trains of London Underground, side panels for Bombardier Electrostar trains at Sapa Group and side panels for Alstom's British Rail Class 390 Pendolino trains are made at Sapa Group. Japanese commuter and express A-trains, and British Rail Class 395 trains are friction stir welded by Hitachi, while Kawasaki applies friction stir spot welding to roof panels and Sumitomo Light Metal produces Shinkansen floor panels. Innovative FSW floor panels are made by Hammerer Aluminium Industries in Austria for the Stadler Kiss double decker rail cars, to obtain an internal height of 2 m on both floors and for the new car bodies of the Wuppertal Suspension Railway.

Heat sinks for cooling high-power electronics of locomotives are made at Sykatek, EBG, Austerlitz Electronics, EuroComposite, Sapa and Rapid Technic AG, and are the most common application of FSW due to the excellent heat transfer.

=== Fabrication ===
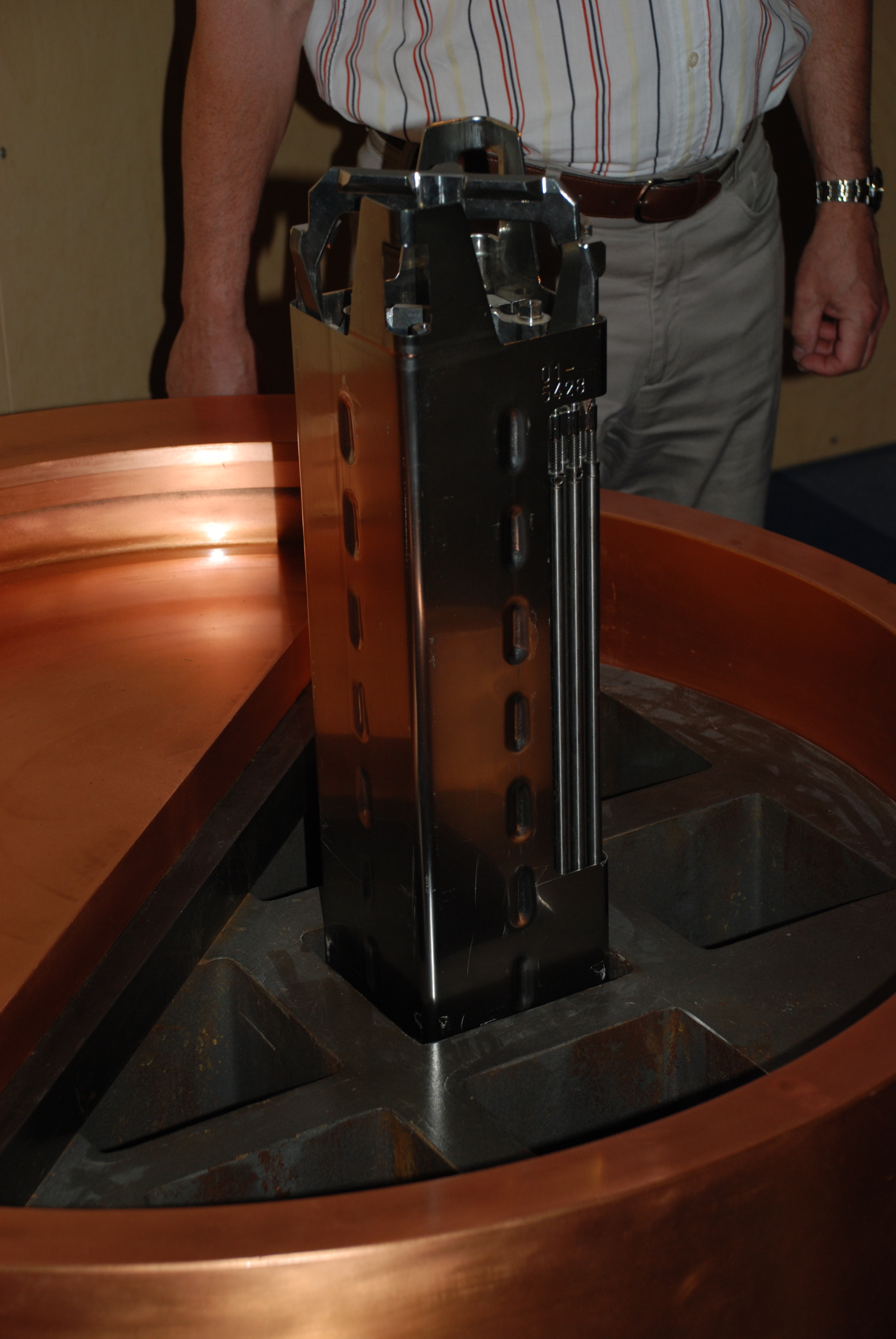
The lids of 50-mm-thick copper canisters for nuclear waste are attached to the cylinder by friction stir welding at SKB

Façade panels and cathode sheets are friction stir welded at AMAG and Hammerer Aluminium Industries, including friction stir lap welds of copper to aluminium. Bizerba meat slicers, Ökolüfter HVAC units and Siemens X-ray vacuum vessels are friction stir welded at Riftec. Vacuum valves and vessels are made by FSW at Japanese and Swiss companies. FSW is also used for the encapsulation of nuclear waste at SKB in 50-mm-thick copper canisters. Pressure vessels from ø1 m semispherical forgings of 38.1 mm thick aluminium alloy 2219 at Advanced Joining Technologies and Lawrence Livermore Nat Lab. Friction stir processing is applied to ship propellers at Friction Stir Link, Inc. and to hunting knives by DiamondBlade. Bosch uses it in Worcester for the production of heat exchangers.

=== Robotics ===
KUKA Robot Group has adapted its KR500-3MT heavy-duty robot for friction stir welding via the DeltaN FS tool. The system made its first public appearance at the EuroBLECH show in November 2012.

=== Personal computers ===
Apple applied friction stir welding on the 2012 iMac to effectively join the bottom to the back of the device.

== See also ==
- Dissimilar friction stir welding
- Friction hydro pillar processing
- Friction stir processing
- Friction welding
- Category:Friction stir welding experts
