= Friction stir processing =

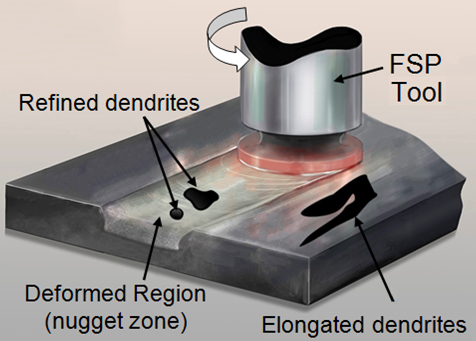
Schematic of friction stir processing. The processed metal is subjected to high strain that modifies its dendrite (grain) pattern – the dendrites are smaller and more round in the nugget zone than in the undeformed regions.

Friction stir processing (FSP) is a method of changing the properties of a metal through intense, localized plastic deformation. This deformation is produced by forcibly inserting a non-consumable tool into the workpiece, and revolving the tool in a stirring motion as it is pushed laterally through the workpiece. The precursor of this technique, friction stir welding, is used to join multiple pieces of metal without creating the heat affected zone typical of fusion welding.

When ideally implemented, this process mixes the material without changing the phase (by melting or otherwise) and creates a microstructure with fine, equiaxed grains. This homogeneous grain structure, separated by high-angle boundaries, allows some aluminium alloys to take on superplastic properties. Friction stir processing also enhances the tensile strength and fatigue strength of the metal. In tests with actively cooled magnesium-alloy workpieces, the microhardness was almost tripled in the area of the friction stir processed seam (to 120–130 Vickers hardness).

== Process ==
In friction stir processing (FSP), a rotating tool is used with a pin and a shoulder to a single piece of material to make specific property enhancement, such as improving the material's toughness or flexibility, in a specific area in the micro-structure of the material via fine grain of a second material with properties that improve the first.(Ma) Friction between the tool and workpieces results in localized heating that softens and plasticizes the workpiece. A volume of processed material is produced by movement of materials from the front of the pin to the back of the pin. During this process, the material undergoes intense plastic deformation and this results in significant grain refinement. (Mishra) FSP changes physical properties without changing physical state which helps engineers create things such as "high-strain-rate superplasticity". The grain refinement occurs on the base material improving properties of the first material, while mixing with the second material. This allows for a variety of materials to be altered to be changed for things that may require other difficult to acquire conditions. The processes branches off of friction stir welding (FSW) which uses the same process to weld two pieces of different materials together without heating, melting, or having to change the materials' physical state.

== Tool ==
The tool has a crucial part to creation of the final product. The tool has two main functions:

1. Localized heating
2. Material flow

The tool in its simplest form consists of a shoulder, a small cylinder with a diameter of 50 mm, and a pin, a small threaded cylinder similar to a drill. The tool itself has been modified to reduce displaced volume of the metals as they merged. Recently two new pin geometries have arisen:

1. Flared-Triflute – introducing flutes (large carving vertically on the pin)
2. A-skew – the pin axis being inclined to the axis of the spindle.

== Applications ==
The FSP is used when metals properties want to be improved using other metals for support and improvement of the first. This is promising process for the automotive and aerospace industries where new material will need to be developed to improve resistance to wear, creep, and fatigue. (Misha) Examples of materials successfully processed using the friction stir technique include AA 2519, AA 5083 and AA 7075 aluminum alloys, AZ61 magnesium alloy, nickel-aluminium bronze and 304L stainless steel.

=== Casting ===
Metallic parts produced by casting are comparatively inexpensive, but are often subject to metallurgical flaws like porosity and microstructural defects. Friction stir processing can be used to introduce a wrought microstructure into a cast component and eliminate many of the defects. By vigorously stirring a cast metal part to homogenize it and reduce the grain size, the ductility and strength are increased.

=== Powder metallurgy ===
Friction stir processing can also be used to improve the microstructural properties of powder metal objects. In particular, when dealing with aluminium powder metal alloys, the aluminium oxide film on the surface of each granule is detrimental to the ductility, fatigue properties and fracture toughness of the workpiece. While conventional techniques for removing this film include forging and extrusion, friction stir processing is suited for situations where localized treatment is desired.

=== Fabrication of metal matrix composites ===
FSP can also be used to fabricate metal matrix composites at the nugget zone where we need the change of properties. Al 5052/SiC and some other composites were successfully fabricated. Even nano composites can also be fabricated by FSP.

=== Aluminium surface composites with superior properties ===
Aluminium surface composites with enhanced surface properties can be fabricated using FSP. Aluminium surface composites fabricated with the optimum friction stir processing parameters show better mechanical properties and corrosion resistance. The processing parameters such as tool rotational speed and tool shoulder diameter affects the surface properties. Higher surface hardness is exhibited by the surface composites fabricated at higher tool rotational speed and lower tool shoulder diameter. The properties of the composite materials can be altered by changing the type of reinforcement. Reinforcement particles aids in the grain size refinement as well as the property enhancement in the processed materials. The surface composite properties can be varied by changing the reinforcement particles based on the end application. The reinforcement phases can be metallic, ceramic, or polymer materials.

== Testing ==
=== Magnesium based nano-composites ===
FSP was used to modify a Mg alloy and insert nano-sized SiO_{2}. The test was conducted a total four times with the average grain size varying from 0.5–2μm. This nearly doubled the hardness of the Mg and also increased the super-plasticity. At room temperature, the yield stress of the FSP composites was improved in the 1D and in the 2D specimens signifying a larger resistance of the product metal under high stress conditions without deforming. The tensile strength was shown to increase along with the yield stress.

== Benefits ==
FSP has benefits for when two materials' would be needed to be mixed. "FSP is a short route, solid state processing technique with one-step processing that achieves microstructural refinement densification and homogeneity" (Ma) FSW helps modify materials so that metaling down or changing the material drastically does not have to take place. FSP, for example, can easily change the form of a piece of material as sheets of metal, where before it may have had to be melted down before and put into a mold for it to cool and form. (Smith, Mishra) "The microstructure and mechanical properties of the processed zone can be accurately controlled by optimizing the tool design, FSP parameters an active cooling/heating." (Ma) The same sheet of metal can be modified to fit various situations with the proper modification of the tool. FSP has shown to make metallic alloys bendable as for example an alloy modified with FSP would be able to bend to 30 degrees as before it could only bend to seven.

== See also ==
- Friction stir welding
