= Friction hydro pillar processing =

Friction hydro-pillar processing (FHPP) is a solid-state joining technology which can be used for filling of surface and sub-surface cracks in thick metals. For example, FHPP was attempted for the first time to repair cracks in space shuttle external components of high-strength aluminum alloys. FHPP is also considered in repairing surface cracks in steam turbine rotors of a high-strength, high-temperature-resistant steel (grade 26NiCrMoV14-5) (Ref). Alternative methods such as fusion welding processes for in-service repairing of cracks in components of these high-strength steels remained difficult because of their high hardenability and mandatory need of pre-heating and post-weld heat treatment. In contrast, initial FHPP trials could achieve joint strengths up to 90% of the base materials in high-strength steel components, especially those used for petrochemical and thermal power plants. In particular, pressurized pipes and vessels of AISI 4140 steel are widely used in the power generation, oil and gas, and petrochemical industries. Initial studies on FHPP of this alloy have shown promising results.

Fusion welding of AISI 4140 steel is usually recommended in annealed condition and with low hydrogen diffusible filler wires of relatively lower strength, e.g., ER70S-2 and ER80S-D2, because of the very high hardenability of Cr-Mo steels. Careful pre-heating and post weld heat treatments procedures must be followed to avoid cold cracking, reduce residual stresses and decrease impairment of HAZ properties in fusion welding of Cr-Mo and high-carbon steels. Since FHPP is a solid-state joining process, several of the aforementioned issues can be alleviated. A systematic analysis of FHPP of Cr-Mo and Carbon steels is therefore needed but scarce in the literature.

An increase in stud force led to faster plastic flow of the stud and therefore reduced the overall processing time and peak temperature. However, the effect of the reduced processing time and lower peak temperature on the joint properties were not well addressed in the literature. Improper selection of the stud force often led to "lack of filling" defects near the crack hole bottom in FHPP of high-strength steels. FHPP is also attempted under the water to reduce the peak temperature in components of high-strength line pipe X65 steels (Ref). However, the resulting joint exhibited a full martensite structure due to higher cooling rates. A fairly uniform hardness distribution across the joint was reported in FHPP of C-Mn steel especially at lower stud forces (Ref). Although these studies provided an insight into FHPP of steels, a quantitative understanding of the effect of process variables on the temperature field, cooling rate and resulting joint hardness distribution remained scarce in FHPP of high-strength steels.
