= IEOM Society International =

American-based events organization

- Industrial Engineering and Operations Management Society International
- Abbreviation: IEOM
- Type: Nonprofit professional organization
- Tax ID no.: 81-1537444
- Legal status: 501(c)(3) nonprofit organization
- Headquarters: 21411 Civic Center Dr., Suite 205, Southfield, Michigan 48076, U.S.
- Region served: International
- Services: Conferences, conference proceedings, awards, and competitions
- Chief Executive Officer: Ahad Ali
- Chief Operating Officer: Don Reimer
- Website: ieomsociety.org

IEOM Society International (IEOM) is an international research organization associated with conferences, awards, and student competitions in the fields of industrial engineering and operations management.

== Activities ==
IEOM Society International's activities center on the organization of conferences and related academic events in the field of industrial engineering and operations management. Sources provided by universities and partner institutions associate the organization with conferences held in Dubai in 2015, Kuala Lumpur in 2016, Bangkok in 2019, Singapore in 2021, Muscat in 2024, and Vellore and Bangladesh in 2025. An April 2026 report by the American International University-Bangladesh also identified the organization as the organizer of the 7th Asia Pacific International Conference on IEOM in Thailand, hosted by Thammasat University.

These conferences have been described as venues for the presentation of research, professional exchange, and discussion of developments in industrial engineering and operations management among academics, researchers, practitioners, and students.

== Awards and competitions ==
Awards and competitions form part of IEOM Society International's conference activities. These have included recognition for student achievement, research, paper presentations, professional service, and contributions to the fields of industrial engineering and operations management.

== Geographic scope ==
IEOM Society International organizes several events and activities like conferences, symposiums etc in the United Arab Emirates, Malaysia, Thailand, Singapore, Oman, India, Bangladesh, and the Philippines.
