= Laser beam welding =

Welding technique

A robot performs remote fibre laser welding.

Laser beam welding (LBW) is a welding technique used to join pieces of metal or thermoplastics through the use of a laser. The beam provides a concentrated heat source, allowing for narrow, deep welds and high welding rates. The process is frequently used in high volume and precision requiring applications using automation, as in the automotive and aeronautics industries. It is based on keyhole or penetration mode welding.

== Operation ==
Like electron-beam welding (EBW), laser beam welding has high power density (on the order of 1 MW/cm^{2}) resulting in small heat-affected zones and high heating and cooling rates. The spot size of the laser can vary between 0.2 mm and 13 mm, though only smaller sizes are used for welding. The depth of penetration is proportional to the amount of power supplied, but is also dependent on the location of the focal point: penetration is maximized when the focal point is slightly below the surface of the workpiece.

A continuous or pulsed laser beam may be used depending upon the application. Millisecond-long pulses are used to weld thin materials such as razor blades while continuous laser systems are employed for deep welds.

LBW is a versatile process, capable of welding carbon steels, HSLA steels, stainless steel, aluminum, and titanium. Due to high cooling rates, cracking is a concern when welding high-carbon steels. The weld quality is high, similar to that of electron beam welding. The speed of welding is proportional to the amount of power supplied but also depends on the type and thickness of the workpieces. The high power capability of gas lasers make them especially suitable for high volume applications. LBW is particularly dominant in the automotive industry.

Some of the advantages of LBW in comparison to EBW are:

- the laser beam can be transmitted through air rather than requiring a vacuum
- the process is easily automated with robotic machinery
- x-rays are not generated
- LBW results in higher quality welds

A derivative of LBW, laser-hybrid welding, combines the laser of LBW with an arc welding method such as gas metal arc welding (GMAW). This combination allows for greater positioning flexibility, since GMAW supplies molten metal to fill the joint, and due to the use of a laser, increases the welding speed over what is normally possible with GMAW. Weld quality tends to be higher as well, since the potential for undercutting is reduced.

== Equipment ==
=== Automation and CAM ===
Although laser beam welding can be accomplished by hand, most systems are automated and use a system of computer aided manufacturing based on computer aided designs. Laser welding can also be coupled with milling to form a finished part.

In 2016 the RepRap project, which historically worked on fused filament fabrication, expanded to development of open source laser welding systems. Such systems have been fully characterized and can be used in a wide scale of applications while reducing conventional manufacturing costs.

=== Lasers ===
- The two types of lasers commonly used are solid-state lasers (especially ruby lasers and Nd:YAG lasers) and gas lasers.
- The first type uses one of several solid media, including synthetic ruby (chromium in aluminum oxide), neodymium in glass (Nd:glass), and the most common type, neodymium in yttrium aluminum garnet (Nd:YAG).
- Gas lasers use mixtures of gases such as helium, nitrogen, and carbon dioxide (CO_{2} laser) as a medium.
- Regardless of type, however, when the medium is excited, it emits photons and forms the laser beam.

==== Solid state ====
Solid-state lasers operate at wavelengths on the order of 1 micrometer, much shorter than gas lasers used for welding, and as a result require that operators wear special eyewear or use special screens to prevent retina damage. Nd:YAG lasers can operate in both pulsed and continuous mode, but the other types are limited to pulsed mode. The original and still popular solid-state design is a single crystal shaped as a rod approximately 20 mm in diameter and 200 mm long, and the ends are ground flat. This rod is surrounded by a flash tube containing xenon or krypton. When flashed, a pulse of light lasting about two milliseconds is emitted by the laser. Disk shaped crystals are growing in popularity in the industry, and flashlamps are giving way to diodes due to their high efficiency. Typical power output for ruby lasers is 10–20 W, while the Nd:YAG laser outputs between 0.04–6,000 W. To deliver the laser beam to the weld area, fiber optics are usually employed.

==== Gas ====
Gas lasers use high-voltage, low-current power sources to supply the energy needed to excite the gas mixture used as a lasing medium. These lasers can operate in both continuous and pulsed mode, and the wavelength of the CO_{2} gas laser beam is 10.6 μm, deep infrared, i.e. 'heat'. Fiber optic cable absorbs and is destroyed by this wavelength, so a rigid lens and mirror delivery system is used. Power outputs for gas lasers can be much higher than solid-state lasers, reaching 25 kW.

==== Fiber ====
In fiber lasers, a doped optical fiber serves as the gain medium in which laser light is amplified. Such lasers are capable of power up to 50 kW and are increasingly being used for robotic industrial welding.

=== Laser beam delivery ===
Modern laser beam welding machines can be grouped into two types. In the traditional type, the laser output is moved to follow the seam. This is usually achieved with a robot. In many modern applications, remote laser beam welding is used. In this method, the laser beam is moved along the seam with the help of a laser scanner, so that the robotic arm does not need to follow the seam any more. The advantages of remote laser welding are the higher speed and the higher precision of the welding process.

== Thermal modeling of pulsed-laser welding ==
Pulsed-laser welding has advantages over continuous wave (CW) laser welding. Some of these advantages are lower porosity and less spatter. Pulsed-laser welding also has some disadvantages such as causing hot cracking in aluminum alloys. Thermal analysis of the pulsed-laser welding process can assist in prediction of welding parameters such as depth of fusion, cooling rates, and residual stresses. Due to the complexity of the pulsed laser process, it is necessary to employ a procedure that involves a development cycle. The cycle involves constructing a mathematical model, calculating a thermal cycle using numerical modeling techniques like either finite elemental modeling (FEM) or finite difference method (FDM) or analytical models with simplifying assumptions, and validating the model by experimental measurements.

A methodology combining some of the published models involves:

1. Determining the power absorption efficiency.
2. Calculating the recoil pressure based on temperatures and a Clausius-Clapeyron equation.
3. Calculate the fluid flow velocities using the volume of fluid method (VOF).
4. Calculating the temperature distribution.
5. Increment time and repeat steps 1–4.
6. Validating of results

=== Step 1 ===
Not all radiant energy is absorbed and turned into heat for welding. Some of the radiant energy is absorbed in the plasma created by vaporizing and then subsequently ionizing the gas. In addition, the absorptivity is affected by the wavelength of the beam, the surface composition of the material being welded, the angle of incidence, and the temperature of the material.

Rosenthal point source assumption leaves an infinitely high temperature discontinuity which is addressed by assuming a Gaussian distribution instead. Radiant energy is also not uniformly distributed within the beam. Some devices produce Gaussian energy distributions, whereas others can be bimodal. A Gaussian energy distribution can be applied by multiplying the power density by a function like this:$f(r)=\exp(-r^2/a_o^2)$, where r is the radial distance from the center of the beam, $a_o$=beam radius or spot size.

Using a temperature distribution instead of a point source assumption allows for easier calculation of temperature-dependent material properties such as absorptivity. On the irradiated surface, when a keyhole is formed, Fresnel reflection (the almost complete absorption of the beam energy due to multiple reflection within the keyhole cavity) occurs and can be modeled by $\alpha_{\theta}=1-R_{\theta}=1-0.5{{1+(1-\epsilon \cos \theta)^2 \over {1+{1+\epsilon \cos \theta)^2}}}+ {{{\epsilon^2}-2\epsilon \cos \theta+2 \cos^2 \theta} \over {\epsilon^2}+2\epsilon \cos \theta+2 \cos^2 \theta}}$, where ε is a function of dielectric constant, electric conductivity, and laser frequency. θ is the angle of incidence. Understanding the absorption efficiency is key to calculating thermal effects.

=== Step 2 ===
Lasers can weld in one of two modes: conduction and keyhole. Which mode is in operation depends on whether the power density is sufficiently high enough to cause evaporation. Conduction mode occurs below the vaporization point while keyhole mode occurs above the vaporization point. The keyhole is analogous to an air pocket. The air pocket is in a state of flux. Forces such as the recoil pressure of the evaporated metal open the keyhole while gravity (aka hydrostatic forces) and metal surface tension tend to collapse it. At even higher power densities, the vapor can be ionized to form a plasma.

The recoil pressure is determined by using the Clausius-Clapeyron equation.${dP \over dT}={d\Delta H_{LV} \over dT\Delta V_{LV}}\thickapprox {d\Delta H_{LV}\over T_{LV} V_{LV}}$, where P is the equilibrium vapor pressure, T is the liquid surface temperature, H_{LV} is the latent heat of vaporization, T_{LV} is the equilibrium temperature at the liquid-vapor interface. Using the assumption that the vapor flow is limited to sonic velocities, one gets that $P_r\approxeq0.54P_oexp(\Delta H_{LV}{{T-T_{LV}\over RTT_{LV}}})$, where Po is atmospheric pressure and Pr is recoil pressure.

=== Step 3 ===
This pertains to keyhole profiles. Fluid flow velocities are determined by

$\bigtriangledown*\overrightarrow{v}=0$

${\partial \overrightarrow{v}\over\partial t}+ (\overrightarrow{v}*\bigtriangledown)\overrightarrow{v} =-{1 \over \rho} \bigtriangledown P +v\bigtriangledown\overrightarrow{v}+\beta\overrightarrow{g}\Delta T$

${\partial F \over\partial t}+(\overrightarrow{v}* \bigtriangledown) F = 0$

where $\overrightarrow{v}$ is the velocity vector, P=pressure, ρ= mass density, $v$=viscosity, β=thermal expansion coefficient, g=gravity, and F is the volume fraction of fluid in a simulation grid cell.

=== Step 4 ===
In order to determine the boundary temperature at the laser impingement surface, you would apply an equation like this. $k_n{\partial T\over \partial n}-q+h(T-T_o)+\sigma \epsilon (T^4-T^2_o)=0$, where kn=the thermal conductivity normal to the surface impinged on by the laser, h=convective heat transfer coefficient for air, σ is the Stefan–Boltzmann constant for radiation, and ε is the emissivity of the material being welded on, q is laser beam heat flux.

Unlike CW (Continuous Wave) laser welding which involves one moving thermal cycle, pulsed laser involves repetitively impinging on the same spot, thus creating multiple overlapping thermal cycles. A method of addressing this is to add a step function that multiplies the heat flux by one when the beam is on but multiplies the heat flux by zero when the beam is off. One way to achieve this is by using a Kronecker delta which modifies q as follows: $q=\delta*qe$, where δ= the Kronecker delta, qe=experimentally determined heat flux. The problem with this method, is it does not allow you to see the effect of pulse duration. One way of solving this is to a use a modifier that is time-dependent function such as:

$$f(n) = \begin{cases} 1, & \text{if }n/v\leq t \leq n/v+\tau \\ 0, & \text{if }n/v+\tau\leq t \leq (n+1)/v \end{cases}$$

where v= pulse frequency, n=0,1, 2,...,v-1), τ= pulse duration.

Next, you would apply this boundary condition and solve for Fourier's 2nd Law to obtain the internal temperature distribution. Assuming no internal heat generation, the solution is $\rho C_p ({\partial T \over \partial t}+\overrightarrow{v} \bigtriangledown T)=k \bigtriangledown T$, where k=thermal conductivity, ρ=density, Cp=specific heat capacity, $\overrightarrow{v}$=fluid velocity vector.

=== Step 5 ===
Incrementing is done by discretizing the governing equations presented in the previous steps and applying the next time and length steps.

=== Step 6 ===
Results can be validated by specific experimental observations or trends from generic experiments. These experiments have involved metallographic verification of the depth of fusion.

=== Consequences of simplifying assumptions ===
The physics of pulsed laser can be very complex and therefore, some simplifying assumptions need to be made to either speed up calculation or compensate for a lack of materials properties. The temperature-dependence of material properties such as specific heat are ignored to minimize computing time.

The liquid temperature can be overestimated if the amount of heat loss due to mass loss from vapor leaving the liquid-metal interface is not accounted for.

== See also ==
- Laser metal deposition
