= Equiaxed crystal =

Equiaxed crystals are crystals that have spatial axes of approximately the same length. They tend to have higher strength and ductility than non-equiaxed crystals. The equiaxed grain structure increases the difficulty of crack propagation through the material, which increases the strength and fatigue resistance of the material.

Equiaxed grains can in some cases be an indication for recrystallization.

Equiaxed crystals can be achieved by heat treatment, namely annealing and normalizing. Certain materials can also be used to induce the preferential growth of equiaxed crystals, as opposed to columnar crystals, during the crystallisation process. For instance, niobium-based compounds were found to inhibit the growth of columnar crystals and promote the growth of equiaxed crystals in Al-10Si braze alloy. It is also found that the presence of nuclei for seeding can be helpful in achieving a more uniform grain structure.

A concern in equiaxial growth in a pure metal is the existence of morphological instabilities, due to small surface perturbations causing the formation of dendrites that have preferred growth directions relative to their crystal structure. Refiners can be added to a solution to mitigate this issue. Additionally, the formation of non-dendritic equiaxed grains can be made possible using ultrasonic, magnetic or pulsed magnetic and electric current pulse techniques.

== See also ==
- Columnar phase
