= Fusion welding =

Welding processes which rely on melting to join materials

Classification of fusion welding processes based on energy source, thermal source, mechanical loading and shielding

Fusion welding is a generic term for welding processes that rely on melting to join materials of similar compositions and melting points. Due to the high-temperature phase transitions inherent to these processes, a heat-affected zone is created in the material (although some techniques, like beam welding, often minimize this effect by introducing comparatively little heat into the workpiece).

In contrast to fusion welding, solid-state welding does not involve the melting of materials.

== Applications ==
Fusion welding has been a critical factor in the creation of modern civilization due to its vital role in construction practices. Besides bolts and rivets, there are no other practical methods for joining pieces of metal securely. Fusion welding is used in the manufacture of many everyday items, including airplanes, cars, and structures. Beyond construction, a large community uses both arc and flame contact welding to create artwork.

== Types ==
=== Electrical ===
==== Arc ====
Arc welding is one of the many types of fusion welding. Arc welding joins two pieces of metal together by using an intermediate filler metal. The way this works is by completing an electrical circuit to create an electrical arc. This electrical arc is 6500 °F (3593 °C) in its center. This electrical arc is created at the tip of the filler metal. As the arc melts the metal, it is moved either by a person or a machine along the gap in the metals, creating a bond. This method is very common as it is typically done with a hand held machine. Arc welding machines are portable and can be brought onto job sites and hard to reach areas. It is also the most common method of underwater welding. Electrical arcs form between points separated by a gas. In the process of underwater welding a bubble of gas is blown around the area being welded so that an electrical arc may form. Underwater welding has many applications. Ship hulls are repaired and oil rigs are maintained with underwater arc welding.

Resistance welding is done using two electrodes. Each comes into contact with one of the pieces being welded. The two pieces of metal are then pressed together between the electrodes and an electric current is run through them. The pieces of metal begin to heat up at the point where they come into contact. The current is passed through the metal until it is hot enough that the two pieces melt and conjoin. As the metal cools the bond is solidified. This process requires large amounts of electricity. In most cases transformers are needed to provide enough amps. Resistance welding is a very prevalent form of fusion welding. It is used in the manufacturing of automobiles and construction equipment.

==== Laser beam ====
Conduction welding, also known as laser beam welding or radiation welding, is a highly precise form of fusion welding. "Laser" is an acronym for Light Amplification by Stimulated Emission of Radiation. The laser emits light in bursts called pumps. These bursts are aimed at the seam of the metals desired to be conjoined. As the laser bursts it is guided along the seam. These intense bursts melt the metal. The two metals when melted mix with each other. Once it has cooled the seam created is a strong bond. Lasers are efficient because they can be configured to make multiple welds at once. The laser beam can be split and sent to multiple locations greatly reducing the cost and amount of energy required. Laser beam welding finds applications in the automotive industry.

==== Induction ====
Induction welding is a form of resistance welding. However, there are no points of contact between the metal being welding and the electrical source or the welder. In induction welding a coil is wrapped around a cylinder. This coil causes a magnetic field across the surface of the metal inside. This magnetic field flows in the opposite direction of the magnetic field on the inside of the cylinder. These magnetic flows impede each other. This heats the metal and causes the edges to melt together.

=== Chemical ===
==== Oxyfuel ====
Flame contact is a very common form of welding. The most popular kind of flame contact welding is oxyfuel gas welding. Flame contact welding uses a flame exposed to the surface of the metals being welded to melt and then join them together. Oxyfuel uses oxygen as a primary ignition source in tandem with another gas such as acetylene to produce a flame which is 2500 °C at the tip and 2800-3500 °C at the tip of the inner cone. Other gasses such as propane and methanol can be used for oxyfuel welding. Acetylene is the most common gas used in oxyfuel welding.

==== Solid reactant ====
Solid reactant welding uses reactions between elements and compounds. Certain compounds when mixed create an exothermic chemical reaction, meaning they give off heat. A very common reaction uses thermite, a combination of a metal oxide (rust) and aluminum. This reaction produces heat over 4,000 °F (2,200 °C). Solid reactant compounds are channeled to the two pieces of metal being joined. Once in place, a catalyst is used to start the reaction. This catalyst can be a chemical or another heat source. The heat created melts the metals being joined. Once it cools, a bond is formed. From welding together train tracks to entering bank vaults, solid reactant welding has many niche uses.

== See also ==
- Autogenous welding – Form of welding where no additional filler material is added
