= Heat-affected zone =

Region of base material which is altered (but not melted) during heat welding

The cross-section of a welded butt joint, with the darkest gray representing the weld or fusion zone, the medium gray the heat-affected zone, and the lightest gray the base material.

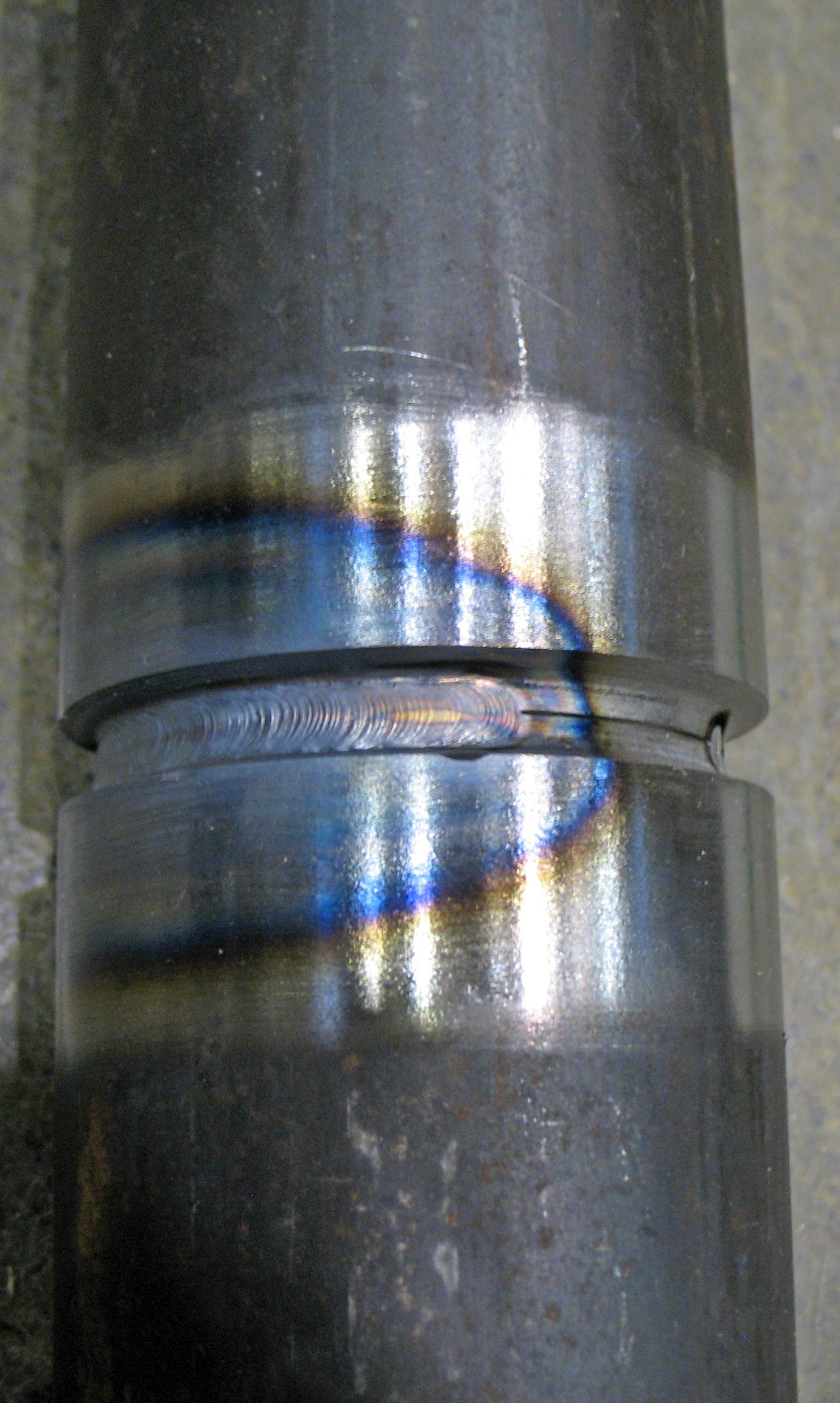
Heat-affected zone around a weld

In fusion welding, the heat-affected zone (HAZ) is the area of base material, either a metal or a thermoplastic, which is not melted but has had its microstructure and properties altered by welding or heat intensive cutting operations. The heat from the welding process and subsequent re-cooling causes this change from the weld interface to the termination of the sensitizing temperature in the base metal. The extent and magnitude of property change depends primarily on the base material, the weld filler metal, and the amount and concentration of heat input by the welding process.

The thermal diffusivity of the base material plays a large role—if the diffusivity is high, the material cooling rate is high and the HAZ is relatively small. Alternatively, a low diffusivity leads to slower cooling and a larger HAZ. The amount of heat input during the welding process also plays an important role as well, as processes like oxyfuel welding use high heat input and increase the size of the HAZ. Processes like laser beam welding and electron beam welding give a highly concentrated, limited amount of heat, resulting in a small HAZ. Arc welding falls between these two extremes, with the individual processes varying somewhat in heat input. To calculate the heat input for arc welding procedures, the following formula is used:

$$Q = \left(\frac{V \times I \times 60}{S \times 1000} \right) \times \mathrm{Efficiency}$$

where Q = heat input (kJ/mm), V = voltage (V), I = current (A), and S = welding speed (mm/min). The efficiency is dependent on the welding process used, with gas tungsten arc welding having a value of 0.6, shielded metal arc welding and gas metal arc welding having a value of 0.8, and submerged arc welding 1.0.
