= Forge welding =

Method of joining metal pieces

Forge welding (FOW), also called fire welding, is a solid-state welding process that joins two pieces of metal by heating them to a high temperature and then hammering them together. It may also consist of heating and forcing the metals together with presses or other means, creating enough pressure to cause plastic deformation at the weld surfaces. The process, although challenging, has been a method of joining metals used since ancient times and is a staple of traditional blacksmithing. Forge welding is versatile, being able to join a host of similar and dissimilar metals. With the invention of electrical welding and gas welding methods during the Industrial Revolution, manual forge-welding has been largely replaced, although automated forge-welding is a common manufacturing process.

== Introduction ==
Forge welding is a process of joining metals by heating them beyond a certain threshold and forcing them together with enough pressure to cause deformation of the weld surfaces, creating a metallic bond between the atoms of the metals. The pressure required varies, depending on the temperature, strength, and hardness of the alloy. Forge welding is the oldest welding technique, and has been used since ancient times.

Welding processes can generally be grouped into two categories: fusion and diffusion welding. Fusion welding involves localized melting of the metals at the weld interfaces, and is common in electric or gas welding techniques. This requires temperatures much higher than the melting point of the metal in order to cause localized melting before the heat can thermally conduct away from the weld, and often a filler metal is used to keep the weld from segregating due to the high surface tension. Diffusion welding consists of joining the metals without melting them, welding the surfaces together while in the solid state.

In diffusion welding, the heat source is often lower than the melting point of the metal, allowing more even heat-distribution thus reducing thermal stresses at the weld. In this method a filler metal is typically not used, but the weld occurs directly between the metals at the weld interface. This includes methods such as cold welding, explosion welding, and forge welding. Unlike other diffusion methods, in forge welding the metals are heated to a high temperature before forcing them together, usually resulting in greater plasticity at the weld surfaces. This generally makes forge welding more versatile than cold-diffusion techniques, which are usually performed on soft metals like copper or aluminum.

In forge welding, the entire welding areas are heated evenly. Forge welding can be used for a much wider range of harder metals and alloys, like steel and titanium.

== History ==
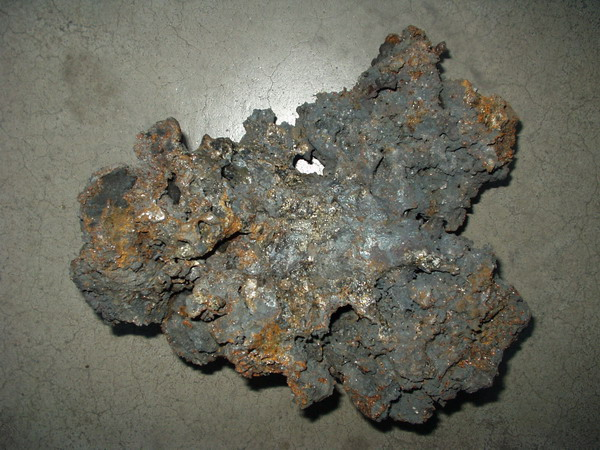
Sponge iron traditionally used to forge the Japanese blade nihonto.

The history of joining metals goes back to the Bronze Age, where bronzes of different hardness were often joined by casting-in. This method consisted of placing a solid part into a molten metal contained in a mold and allowing it to solidify without actually melting both metals, such as the blade of a sword into a handle or the tang of an arrowhead into the tip. Brazing and soldering were also common during the Bronze Age.

The act of welding (joining two solid parts through diffusion) began with iron. The first welding process was forge welding, which started when humans learned to smelt iron from iron ore; most likely in Anatolia (Turkey) around 1800 BC. Ancient people could not create temperatures high enough to melt iron fully, so the bloomery process that was used for smelting iron produced a lump (bloom) of iron grains sintered together with small amounts of slag and other impurities, referred to as sponge iron because of its porosity.

After smelting, the sponge iron needed to be heated above the welding temperature and hammered, or "wrought." This squeezed out air pockets and melted slag, bringing the iron grains into close contact to form a solid block (billet).

Many items made of wrought iron have been found by archeologists, that show evidence of forge welding, which date from before 1000 BC. Because iron was typically made in small amounts, any large object, such as the Delhi Pillar, needed to be forge welded out of smaller billets.

Forge welding grew from a trial-and-error method, becoming more refined over the centuries. Due to the poor quality of ancient metals, it was commonly employed in making composite steels, by joining high-carbon steels, that would resist deformation but break easily, with low-carbon steels, which resist fracture but bend too easily, creating an object with greater toughness and strength than could be produced with a single alloy. This method of pattern welding first appeared around 700 BC, and was primarily used for making weapons such as swords; the most widely known examples being Damascene, Japanese and Merovingian. This process was also common in the manufacture of tools, from wrought-iron plows with steel edges to iron chisels with steel cutting surfaces.

== Materials ==
Many metals can be forge welded, with the most common being both high and low-carbon steels. Iron and even some hypoeutectic cast-irons can be forge welded. Some aluminum alloys can also be forge welded. Metals such as copper, bronze and brass do not forge weld readily. Although it is possible to forge weld copper-based alloys, it is often with great difficulty due to copper's tendency to absorb oxygen during the heating. Copper and its alloys are usually better joined with cold welding, explosion welding, or other pressure-welding techniques. With iron or steel, the presence of even small amounts of copper severely reduces the alloy's ability to forge weld.

Titanium alloys are commonly forge welded. Because of titanium's tendency to absorb oxygen when molten, the solid-state, diffusion bond of a forge weld is often stronger than a fusion weld in which the metal is liquefied.

Forge welding between similar materials is caused by solid-state diffusion. This results in a weld that consists of only the welded materials without any fillers or bridging materials. Forge welding between dissimilar materials is caused by the formation of a lower melting temperature eutectic between the materials. Due to this the weld is often stronger than the individual metals.

== Processes ==
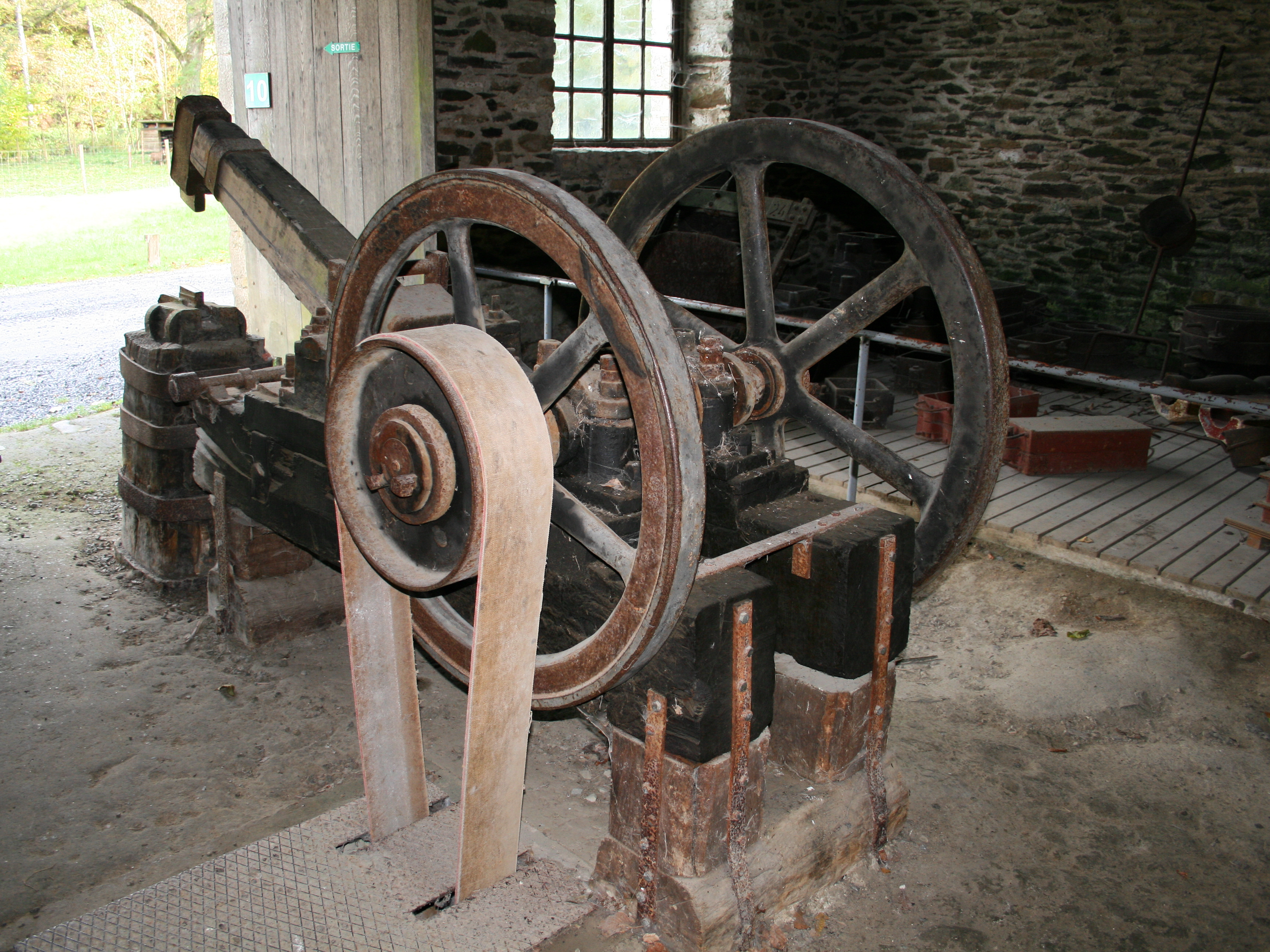
A mechanized trip hammer.

The most well-known and oldest forge-welding process is the manual-hammering method. Manual hammering is done by heating the metal to the proper temperature, coating with flux, overlapping the weld surfaces, and then striking the joint repeatedly with a hand-held hammer. The joint is often formed to allow space for the flux to flow out, by beveling or rounding the surfaces slightly, and hammered in a successively outward fashion to squeeze the flux out. The hammer blows are typically not as hard as those used for shaping, preventing the flux from being blasted out of the joint at the first blow.

When mechanical hammers were developed, forge welding could be accomplished by heating the metal, and then placing it between the mechanized hammer and the anvil. Originally powered by waterwheels, modern mechanical-hammers can also be operated by compressed air, electricity, steam, gas engines, and many other ways. Another method is forge welding with a die, whereby the pieces of metal are heated and then forced into a die which both provides the pressure for the weld and keeps the joint at the finished shape. Roll welding is another forge welding process, where the heated metals are overlapped and passed through rollers at high pressures to create the weld.

Modern forge-welding is often automated, using computers, machines, and sophisticated hydraulic presses to produce a variety of products from a number of various alloys. For example, steel pipe is often forge-welded during the manufacturing process. Flat stock is heated and fed through specially-shaped rollers that both form the steel into a tube and simultaneously provide the pressure to weld the edges into a continuous seam.

Diffusion bonding is a common method for forge welding titanium alloys in the aerospace industry. In this process the metal is heated while in a press or die. Beyond a specific critical-temperature, which varies depending on the alloy, the impurities burn out and the surfaces are forced together.

Other methods include flash welding and percussion welding. These are resistance forge-welding techniques where the press or die is electrified, passing high current through the alloy to create the heat for the weld. Shielded active-gas forge-welding is a process of forge welding in an oxygen-reactive environment, to burn out oxides, using hydrogen gas and induction heating.

== Temperature ==
Iron, different steels, and even cast-iron can be welded to each other, provided that their carbon content is close enough that the welding ranges overlap. Pure iron can be welded when nearly white hot; between 2,500 °F (1,400 °C) and 2,700 °F (1,500 °C). Steel with a carbon content of 2.0% can be welded when orangish-yellow, between 1,700 °F (900 °C) and 2,000 °F (1,100 °C). Common steel, between 0.2 and 0.8% carbon, is typically welded at a bright yellow heat.

A primary requirement for forge welding is that both weld surfaces need to be heated to the same temperature and welded before they cool too much. When steel reaches the proper temperature, it begins to weld very readily, so a thin rod or nail heated to the same temperature will tend to stick at first contact, requiring it to be bent or twisted loose.

Care must be taken to avoid overheating the metal to the point that it gives off sparks from rapid oxidation (burning), or else the weld will be poor and brittle.

== Decarburization ==
When steel is heated to an austenizing temperature, the carbon begins to diffuse through the iron. The higher the temperature; the greater the rate of diffusion. At such high temperatures, carbon readily combines with oxygen to form carbon dioxide, so the carbon can easily diffuse out of the steel and into the surrounding air. By the end of a blacksmithing job, the steel will be of a lower carbon content than it was prior to heating. Therefore, most blacksmithing operations are done as quickly as possible to reduce decarburization, preventing the steel from becoming too soft.

To produce the right amount of hardness in the finished product, the smith generally begins with steel that has a carbon content that is higher than desired. In ancient times, forging often began with steel that had a carbon content much too high for normal use. Most ancient forge-welding began with hypereutectoid steel, containing a carbon content sometimes well above 1.0%. Hypereutectoid steels are typically too brittle to be useful in a finished product, but by the end of forging the steel typically had a high carbon-content ranging from 0.8% (eutectoid tool-steel) to 0.5% (hypoeutectoid spring-steel).

== Applications ==
Forge welding has been used throughout its history for making most any items out of steel and iron. It has been used in everything from the manufacture of tools, farming implements, and cookware to the manufacture of fences, gates, and prison cells. In the early Industrial Revolution, it was commonly used in the manufacture of boilers and pressure vessels, until the introduction of fusion-welding. It was commonly used through the Middle Ages for producing armor and weapons.

One of the most famous applications of forge welding involves the production of pattern-welded blades. During this process a smith repeatedly draws out a billet of steel, folds it back and welds it upon itself. Another application was the manufacture of shotgun barrels. Metal wire was spooled onto a mandrel, and then forged into a barrel that was thin, uniform, and strong. In some cases the forge-welded objects are acid-etched to expose the underlying pattern of metal, which is unique to each item and provides aesthetic appeal.

Despite its diversity, forge welding had many limitations. A primary limitation was the size of objects that could be forge welded. Larger objects required a bigger heat source, and size reduced the ability to manually weld it together before it cooled too much. Welding large items like steel plate or girders was typically not possible, or at least highly impractical, until the invention of fusion welding, requiring them to be riveted instead. In some cases, fusion welding produced a much stronger weld, such as in the construction of boilers.

== Flux ==
Forge welding requires the weld surfaces to be extremely clean or the metal will not join properly, if at all. Oxides tend to form on the surface while impurities like phosphorus and sulfur tend to migrate to the surface. Often a flux is used to keep the welding surfaces from oxidizing, which would produce a poor quality weld, and to extract other impurities from the metal. The flux mixes with the oxides that form and lowers the melting temperature and the viscosity of the oxides. This enables the oxides to flow out of the joint when the two pieces are beaten together. A simple flux can be made from borax, sometimes with the addition of powdered iron-filings.

The oldest flux used for forge welding was fine silica sand. The iron or steel would be heated in a reducing environment within the coals of the forge. Devoid of oxygen, the metal forms a layer of iron-oxide called wüstite on its surface. When the metal is hot enough, but below the welding temperature, the smith sprinkles some sand onto the metal. The silicon in the sand reacts with the wustite to form fayalite, which melts just below the welding temperature. This produced a very effective flux which helped to make a strong weld.

Early examples of flux used different combinations and various amounts of iron fillings, borax, sal ammoniac, balsam of copaiba, cyanide of potash, and soda phosphate. The 1920 edition of Scientific American book of facts and formulae indicates a frequently offered trade secret as using copperas, saltpeter, common salt, black oxide of manganese, prussiate of potash, and "nice welding sand" (silicate).

== See also ==
- Pattern welding
- Friction welding
- Friction stud welding
