= Explosive device =

Device that creates a violent release of energy

A stick of dynamite: 1. Diatomaceous earth (or any other type of absorbent material) soaked in nitroglycerin; 2. Protective coating surrounding the explosive material; 3. Blasting cap; 4. Wire connected to the blasting cap

An explosive device typically refers to a bomb that is not used by a military. It contains an explosive with a detonator connected to a triggering mechanism to form a device used for a specific purpose.

== Commercial ==
The largest commercial application of explosives is mining. The detonation or deflagration of either a high or low explosive in a confined space can be used to liberate a fairly specific sub-volume of a brittle material (rock) in a much larger volume of the same or similar material. The mining industry tends to use nitrate-based explosives such as emulsions of fuel oil and ammonium nitrate solutions, mixtures of ammonium nitrate prills (fertilizer pellets), fuel oil (ANFO), and gelatinous suspensions or slurries of ammonium nitrate and combustible fuels.

In materials science and engineering, explosives are used in cladding (explosion welding). This is a solid state (solid-phase) process where welding is accomplished by accelerating one of the components at extremely high velocity through the use of explosives. This process is often used to clad carbon steel or aluminium plate with a thin layer of a harder or more corrosion-resistant material.

A video on safety precautions at blast sites

A video describing how to safely handle explosives in mines
