= MPW =

MPW may refer to:

- Macintosh Programmer's Workshop, a software development environment for the Classic Mac OS operating system
- Magnetic pulse welding, a solid state welding process
- Mander Portman Woodward, a group of British independent schools
- Marco Pierre White, British 3-star Michelin chef and TV personality
- Master of Professional Writing Program, a graduate degree program in professional writing
- Michael P. W. Stone (1925–1955), U.S. business executive and federal government administrator
- Michinoku Pro Wrestling, a Lucha libre professional wrestling promotion
- Multi-project wafer service, integrated circuit production that includes designs from various teams
