= Dynamic Materials Corporation =

American metalworking company

- Company type: Public
- Traded as: Nasdaq: BOOM; Russell 2000 Component
- Headquarters: United States

DMC Global Inc. owns and operates Arcadia, DynaEnergetics and NobelClad, three manufacturing businesses that provide to the construction, energy, industrial processing and transportation markets. Arcadia supplies architectural building products, including exterior and interior framing systems, curtain walls, windows, doors, and interior partitions to the commercial construction market; it also supplies customized windows and doors to the residential construction market. DynaEnergetics designs, manufactures and distributes engineered products utilized by the global oil and gas industry principally for the perforation of oil and gas wells. NobelClad is involved in the production of explosion-welded clad metal plates for use in the construction of corrosion resistant industrial processing equipment, as well as specialized transition joints for use in construction of commuter rail cars, ships, and liquified natural gas (LNG) processing equipment.

Arcadia’s products are sold in the United States through a network of service centers and distributors, while DynaEnergetics and NobelClad operate globally through an international network of manufacturing, distribution and sales facilities.
