= Friction stud welding =

Welding technique

Friction stud welding is a solid phase welding technique involving a stud or appurtenance being rotated at high speed while being forced against a substrate, generating heat by friction. The metal surfaces reach a temperature at which they flow plastically under pressure, surface impurities are expelled and a forged weld is formed.

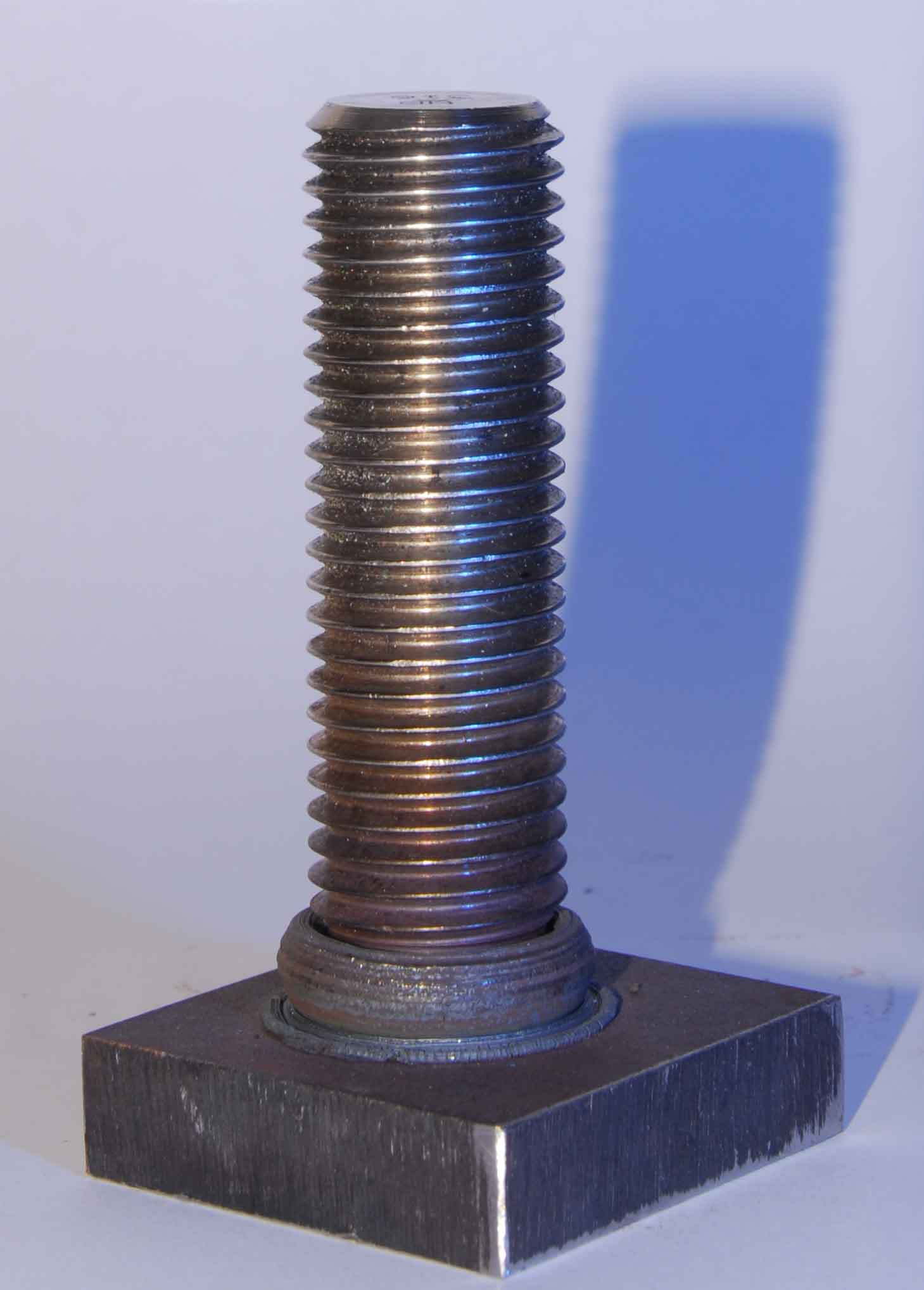
A friction stud weld.

This technique is rather more costly than arc stud welding and is therefore used for special applications where arc welding may present problems, such as:

- welding underwater
- welding on live subsea pipelines to attach anodes
- welding in explosive environments and zoned areas
- welding materials that are difficult to join by fusion welding processes
- friction plug welding

Portable equipment for friction stud welding is available for use on construction work sites, offshore, underwater and in workshops. These portable units are much lighter and smaller than the large static friction welding machines which are used, for example, in factories to weld engine components such as drive shafts.

== Principle of operation ==
A portable friction stud welding tool consists of a motor to rotate the stud at high speed and a piston to apply the necessary force to the stud. The equipment may be air or hydraulically powered. A clamping system is also required to hold the tool onto the work piece and to provide reaction to the force on the stud. The clamps used are typically magnetic or vacuum clamps for flat surfaces, chain or claw clamps for pipes and various mechanical clamps for welding onto I beams or other shapes.

The weld is made by rotating the stud at high speed and forcing it onto the substrate causing friction which heats the stud tip and substrate surface. Metal at the interface between the stud and the substrate flows plastically under pressure, removing impurities from the metal surfaces, and a solid phase weld is formed. The rotation of the stud is then stopped but the force on the stud is maintained for a few seconds. The maximum temperatures reached during welding are much lower than the melting point of the metals.

== Advantages and disadvantages ==
Some notable advantages of the process are:

- The relatively low temperature at which the weld is formed means that the process can be adapted for applications such as welding on live pipelines and in explosive environments.
- The absence of an electric arc and a liquid phase in the metal avoids some of the potential problems encountered with arc welding such as contamination of the weld with hydrogen, nitrogen and oxygen.
- The rapid weld cycle time (typically 5 to 10 seconds) and the method of weld formation result in a fine grain structure.

In the “as welded” condition the residual stresses are compressive which tend to result in good fatigue life. Studs can also be welded through epoxy paint or rubber coatings.

The main disadvantages of this process are:

- The process can only be used to weld relatively small components (such as studs or plugs) which can be rotated at high speed, onto a work piece. The systems used are limited to studs up to typically 25 mm diameter and plugs for filling holes up to typically 25 mm diameter (plug welding).
- The system requires a rigid clamp to hold the welding tool on the work piece and withstand the force applied to the stud during welding. Although these clamps can be moved from one weld location to the next quite rapidly they are generally larger and more cumbersome than is the case with arc stud welding systems.

== Applications ==
For the type of applications listed here it is important that the welding and operating procedures are fully tested and certified for both weld integrity and operational safety prior to use in production. Operators must be trained and systems must be in place to ensure that the procedures are properly applied and risks properly assessed.

=== Welding underwater ===
When this process is used underwater, a shroud is fitted around the stud which prevents the weld from being cooled too rapidly by the surrounding water. The air powered systems can operate underwater to a depth of approximately 20m and are relatively simple for divers to use. The hydraulically powered systems can also be used by divers and have welded to depths in excess of 300m from a Remotely Operated Vehicle (ROV). Current friction stud welding systems are designed to operate to a depth of approximately 1000m.

=== Welding on live subsea pipelines to attach anodes ===
Friction stud welding has been used to retrofit sacrificial anodes to subsea pipelines while the pipeline is “live” (that is, it continues to transport hydrocarbons at pressure). In some cases the anodes are placed on the sea bed next to the pipeline and a lug on a cable from the anode is connected to the stud welded on the pipeline. Another option is a tripartite weld where the lug on the anode cable is made of steel with a tapered hole in it. The tapered end of the stud welds through the hole onto the pipeline, welding to both the lug and the pipe and providing a fully welded connection between the anode cable and pipeline. The advantage of this method is that there is no significant increase in the electrical resistance of the connection due to corrosion during the lifetime of the pipeline. Many subsea pipelines have concrete weight coating on them and a small area of this can be removed with a water jet to permit welding.

=== Welding in explosive environments and zoned areas ===
Friction stud welding has been used to attach grating to offshore oil platforms in areas where arc welding is not permitted because of the risk of causing a fire or explosion. A shroud similar to the one used for welding underwater acts as a barrier between the weld and the surrounding atmosphere. A water screen can also be used as an additional barrier.

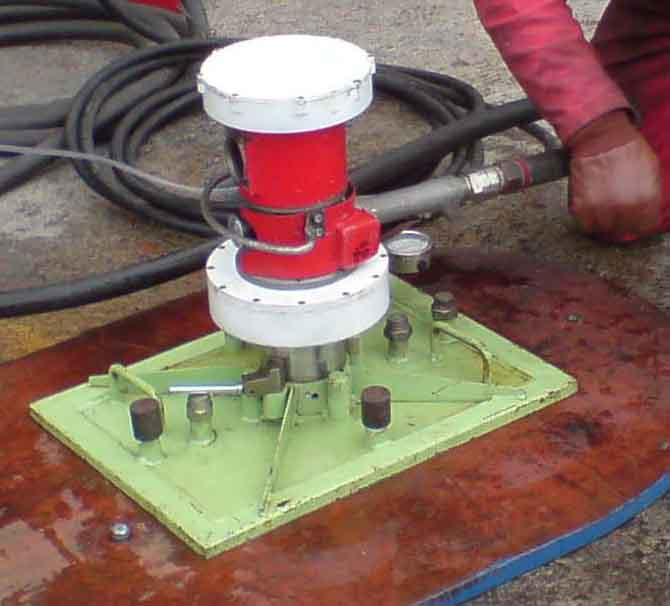
An M16 stud weld being performed with a shroud inside a vacuum clamp. In this example the central part of the clamp is flooded with water during welding.

=== Welding materials that are difficult to join by fusion welding processes ===
Friction stud welding is a solid phase welding process where the metals do not liquefy. This permits metal combinations such as welding aluminium studs to steel which would be problematic with arc welding because of the formation of brittle inter-metallic compounds.

=== Friction plug welding ===
In friction plug welding a tapered shaped plug is friction welded into a tapered hole in the substrate. This welding method can be used to repair defects in castings. It has also been used to fill the holes that occur on completion of a friction stir welding pass when the stirring probe is withdrawn from the weld.

Specific recent applications of friction stud welding include:

- Retrofitting anodes in an FPSO oil storage tank in a Zone 1 area.
- Retrofitting equipment in Zone 1 areas on offshore platforms.
- Attachment of anodes inside seawater discharge pipelines in a gas processing plant.
