= X-ray welding =

Welding using heat from X-ray

X-ray welding is an experimental welding process that uses a high powered X-ray source to provide thermal energy required to weld materials.

The phrase "X-ray welding" also has an older, unrelated usage in quality control. In this context, an X-ray welder is a tradesperson who consistently welds at such a high proficiency that they rarely introduce defects into the weld pool, and are able to recognize and correct defects in the weld pool, during the welding process. It is assumed (or trusted) by the quality control department of a fabrication or manufacturing shop that the welding work performed by an X-ray welder would pass an X-ray inspection. For example, defects like porosity, concavities, cracks, cold laps, slag and tungsten inclusions, lack of fusion & penetration, etc., are rarely seen in a radiographic X-ray inspection of a weldment performed by an X-ray welder.

With the growing use of synchrotron radiation in the welding process, the older usage of the phrase "X-ray welding" might cause confusion; but the two terms are unlikely to be used in the same work environment because synchrotron radiation (X-ray) welding is a remotely automated and mechanized process.

== Introduction ==
Many advances in welding technology have resulted from the introduction of new sources of the thermal energy required for localized melting. These advances include the introduction of modern techniques such as gas tungsten arc, gas-metal arc, submerged-arc, electron beam, and laser beam welding processes. However, whilst these processes were able to improve stability, reproducibility, and accuracy of welding, they share a common limitation - the energy does not fully penetrate the material to be welded, resulting in the formation of a melt pool on the surface of the material.

To achieve welds which penetrate the full depth of the material, it is necessary to either specially design and prepare the geometry of the joint or cause vaporization of the material to such a degree that a "keyhole" is formed, allowing the heat to penetrate the joint. This is not a significant disadvantage in many types of material, as good joint strengths can be achieved, however for certain material classes such as ceramics or metal ceramic composites, such processing can significantly limit joint strength. They have great potential for use in the aerospace industry, provided a joining process that maintains the strength of the material can be found.

Until recently, sources of x-rays of sufficient intensity to cause enough volumetric heating for welding were not available. However, with the advent of third-generation synchrotron radiation sources, it is possible to achieve the power required for localized melting and even vaporization in a number of materials.

X-ray beams have been shown to have potential as welding sources for classes of materials which cannot be welded conventionally.
