= Welding =

Fabrication process for joining materials

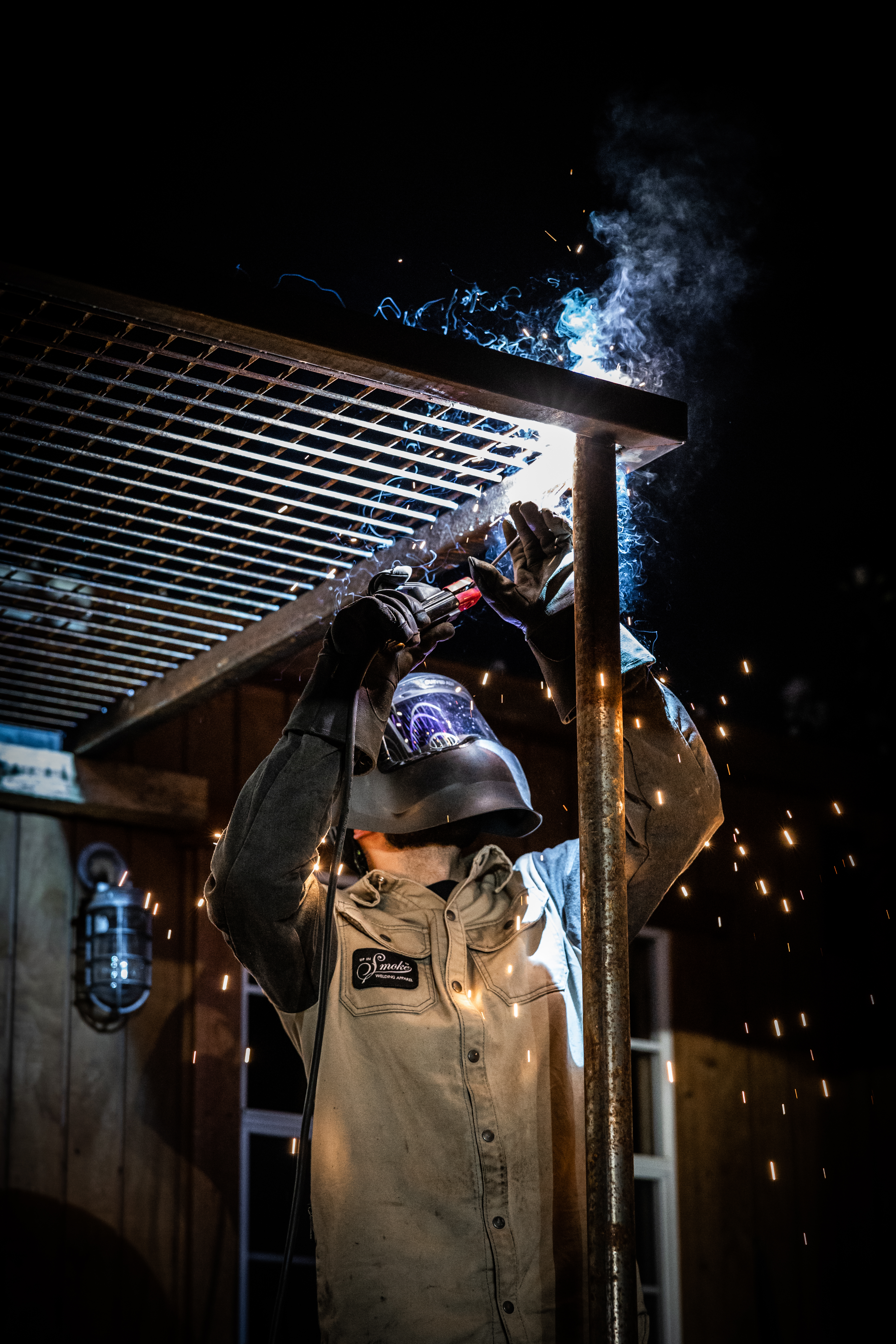
Overhead stick welding

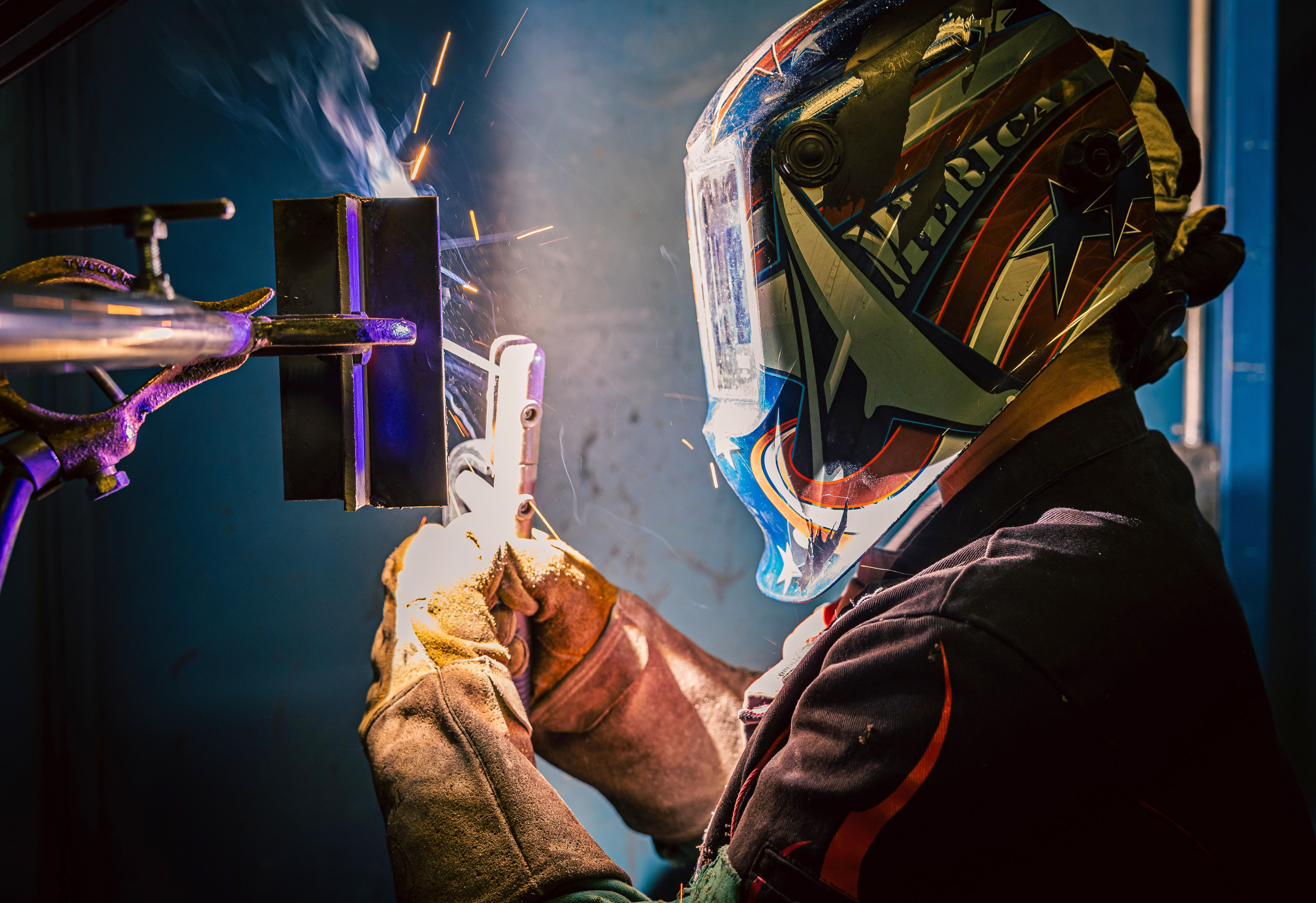
Arc welding metal plates

Welding is a fabrication process that joins materials, usually metals or thermoplastics, primarily by using high temperatures to melt the parts together and allow them to cool, causing fusion. Common alternative methods include solvent welding (of thermoplastics) using chemicals to melt materials being bonded without heat, and solid-state welding processes which bond without melting, such as pressure, cold welding, and diffusion bonding.

Metal welding is distinct from lower-temperature bonding techniques such as brazing and soldering, which do not melt the base metal (parent metal) and instead require flowing a filler metal to solidify their bonds.

In addition to melting the base metal in welding, a filler material is typically added to the joint to form a pool of molten material (the weld pool) that cools to form a joint that can be stronger than the base material. Welding processes use some form of shielding to protect the melting metals from being contaminated or oxidized.

Many different energy sources can be used for welding, including a gas flame (chemical), an electric arc (electrical), a laser, an electron beam, friction, and ultrasound. While often an industrial process, welding may be performed in many different environments, including in the open air, underwater, and in outer space. Welding is a hazardous undertaking and precautions are required to avoid burns, electric shock, vision damage, inhalation of poisonous gases and fumes, and exposure to intense ultraviolet radiation.

Until the end of the 19th century, the only welding process was forge welding, which blacksmiths had used for millennia to join iron and steel by heating and hammering. Arc welding and oxy–fuel welding were among the first processes to develop late in the century, and electric resistance welding followed soon after. Welding technology advanced quickly during the early 20th century, as world wars drove the demand for reliable and inexpensive joining methods. Following the wars, several modern welding techniques were developed, including manual methods like shielded metal arc welding, now one of the most popular welding methods, as well as semi-automatic and automatic processes such as gas metal arc welding, submerged arc welding, flux-cored arc welding and electroslag welding. Developments continued with the invention of laser beam welding, electron beam welding, magnetic pulse welding, and friction stir welding in the latter half of the century. Today, as the science continues to advance, robot welding is commonplace in industrial settings, and researchers continue to develop new welding methods and gain greater understanding of weld quality.

== Etymology ==
The term weld is derived from a Scandinavian word and is possibly related to the Swedish välla (to well) or Danish vælde (to well up or overflow). In the 8th century AD, a period known as the Viking Age began, and Scandinavians settled across England, resulting in loan words, shifts in word meaning, and grammatical changes. In many languages, the terms for welding are related to those for boiling or bubbling. In Old Swedish, välla can mean to boil, to bubble up, to overflow, to boil over, or to melt. The Swedish word for the raw material used to make wrought iron is välljärn, literally meaning "boiling iron".

The Old English word for welding iron together was samodwellung. Derived from the Old English weallan, weld entered usage in Middle English as an alternative form of the verb well (wæll), meaning 'to spring up' (as if from a fountain) or 'to boil'. The added 'd' was excrescent, a consonant added without etymological rationale. It came to mean to boil, to heat to a high degree, or to beat iron after heating.

The word was first recorded in English in 1590. A 14th-century translation of the Christian Bible into English by John Wycliffe translated Isaiah 2:4 as "...thei shul bete togidere their swerdes into shares..." (they shall beat together their swords into plowshares). In a 1590 version, this was changed to "...thei shullen welle togidere her swerdes in-to scharris..." (they shall weld together their swords into plowshares), suggesting that this use of the word became popular in English sometime between these periods.

== History ==
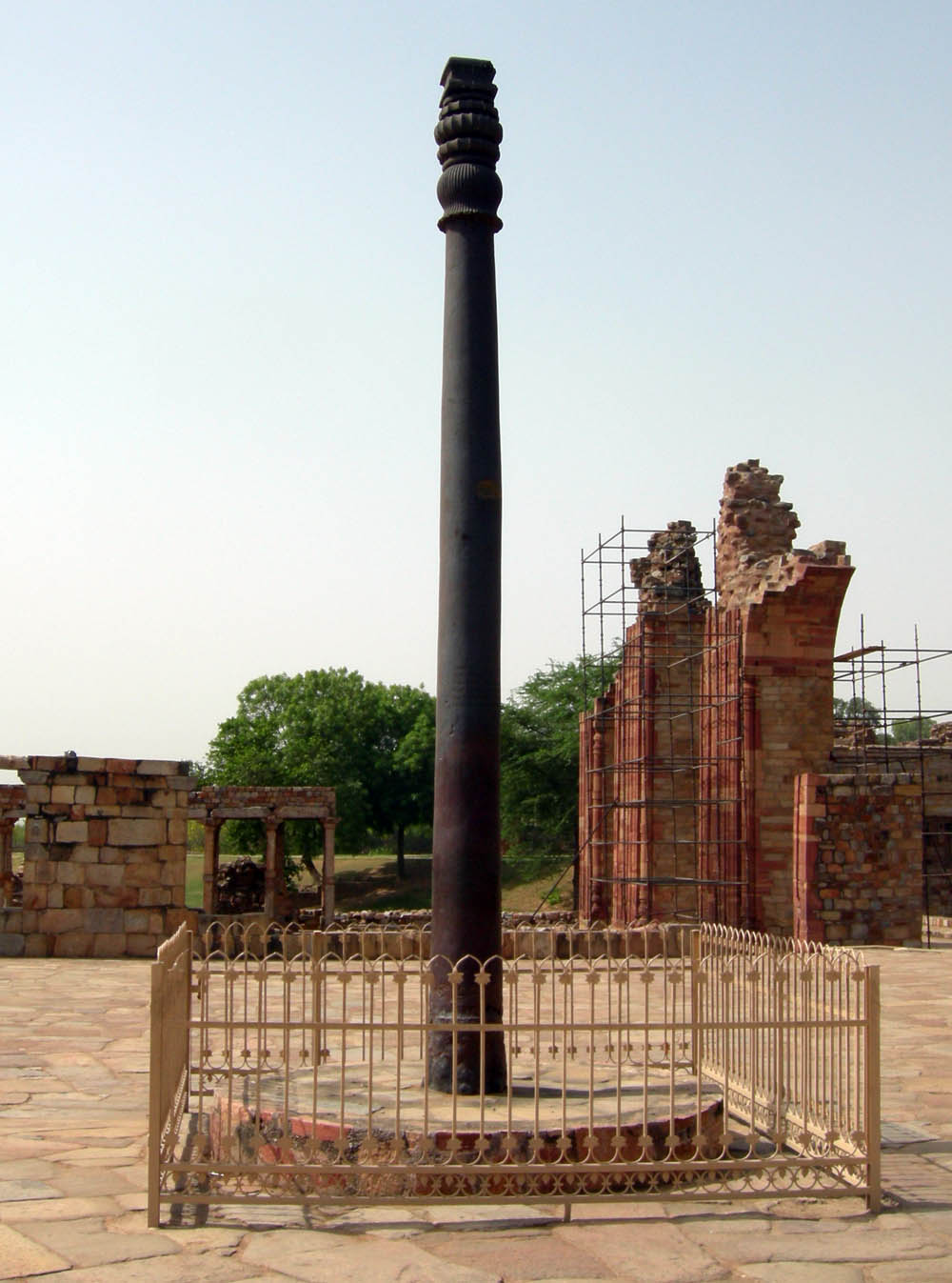
The iron pillar of Delhi, India

The history of joining metals goes back several millennia. Fusion welding processes that join metals by melting them were not widely used in pre-industrial welding. Early welding techniques used pressure to join the metals, often with heat not sufficient to fully melt the base metals. One notable exception was a technique to join sections of large statues. In Greek and Roman lost-wax casting, the statues were cast as smaller pieces and molten bronze was poured into the joints with temperatures sufficient to create fusion welds.

The earliest known welding dates to the Bronze Age. Gold is soft enough to be pressure welded with little to no heat, and archaeologists have found small boxes made by pressure welding overlapping sheets of gold. In the Iron Age, Mediterranean societies developed forge welding. In forge welding, metal is heated to the point that it becomes soft enough for a blacksmith to hammer separate pieces together. Very early examples include the iron objects found with Tutankhamun including an iron headrest and dagger. The dagger was forged from meteoric iron at temperatures below 950 °C (1,740 °F).

Iron metallurgy was independently developed at least twice: in Anatolia by 1800 BC and in China by around 900 BC. Typically, wrought iron is forged at around 1,350 °C (2,460 °F). The ancient Greek historian Herodotus credits Glaucus of Chios with discovering "iron welding". Glaucus is known for an iron pedestal welded to hold a silver krater at Delphi. By the 7th century BC, blast furnaces were developed in China, but the technology traveled westward only during the Islamic Golden Age. By the time they arrived in Europe, blast furnaces were being independently developed in modern-day Germany.

Forge welding in 1904

The European Middle Ages brought advances in forge welding, in which blacksmiths hammered heated metal repeatedly until bonding occurred. In Europe and Africa, forging shifted from open charcoal fires to bloomeries. Forge welding was used in the construction of the Iron pillar of Delhi, erected in Delhi, India about 310 AD and weighing 5.4 metric tons. In 1540, Vannoccio Biringuccio published De la pirotechnia, which includes descriptions of the forging operation. Renaissance craftsmen were skilled in the process, and the industry continued to grow during the following centuries.

In 1800, Sir Humphry Davy discovered the short-pulse electrical arc and presented his results in 1801. In 1802, Russian scientist Vasily Petrov created the continuous electric arc, and subsequently published "News of Galvanic-Voltaic Experiments" in 1803, in which he described experiments carried out in 1802. Of great importance in this work was the description of a stable arc discharge and the indication of its possible use for many applications, one being melting metals. In 1808, Davy, who was unaware of Petrov's work, rediscovered the continuous electric arc. In 1881, French electrical engineer Auguste de Méritens used an arc to join the lead plates in a lead–acid battery. Two inventors from the Russian empire working in a French laboratory, Polish engineer Stanisław Olszewski and de Méritens' pupil Nikolai Benardos, developed the first electric arc welding method, known as carbon arc welding using carbon electrodes, receiving a British patent in 1885 and an American patent in 1887. The advances in arc welding continued with the invention of metal electrodes in the late 1800s by a Russian, Nikolai Slavyanov (1888), and an American, C. L. Coffin (1890). Around 1900, A. P. Strohmenger released a coated metal electrode in Britain, which gave a more stable arc. In 1905, Russian scientist Vladimir Mitkevich proposed using a three-phase electric arc for welding. Alternating current welding was invented by C. J. Holslag in 1919, but did not become popular for another decade.

Resistance welding was also developed during the final decades of the 19th century, with the first patents going to Elihu Thomson in 1885, who produced further advances over the next 15 years. Thermite welding was invented in 1893, and around that time another process, oxy–fuel welding, became well established. Acetylene was discovered in 1836 by Edmund Davy, but its use was not practical in welding until about 1900, when a suitable torch was developed. At first, oxy–fuel welding was one of the more popular welding methods due to its portability and relatively low cost. As the 20th century progressed, however, it fell out of favor for industrial applications. It was largely replaced with arc welding, as advances in metal coatings (known as flux) were made. Flux covering the electrode primarily shields the base material from impurities, but also stabilizes the arc and can add alloying components to the weld metal.

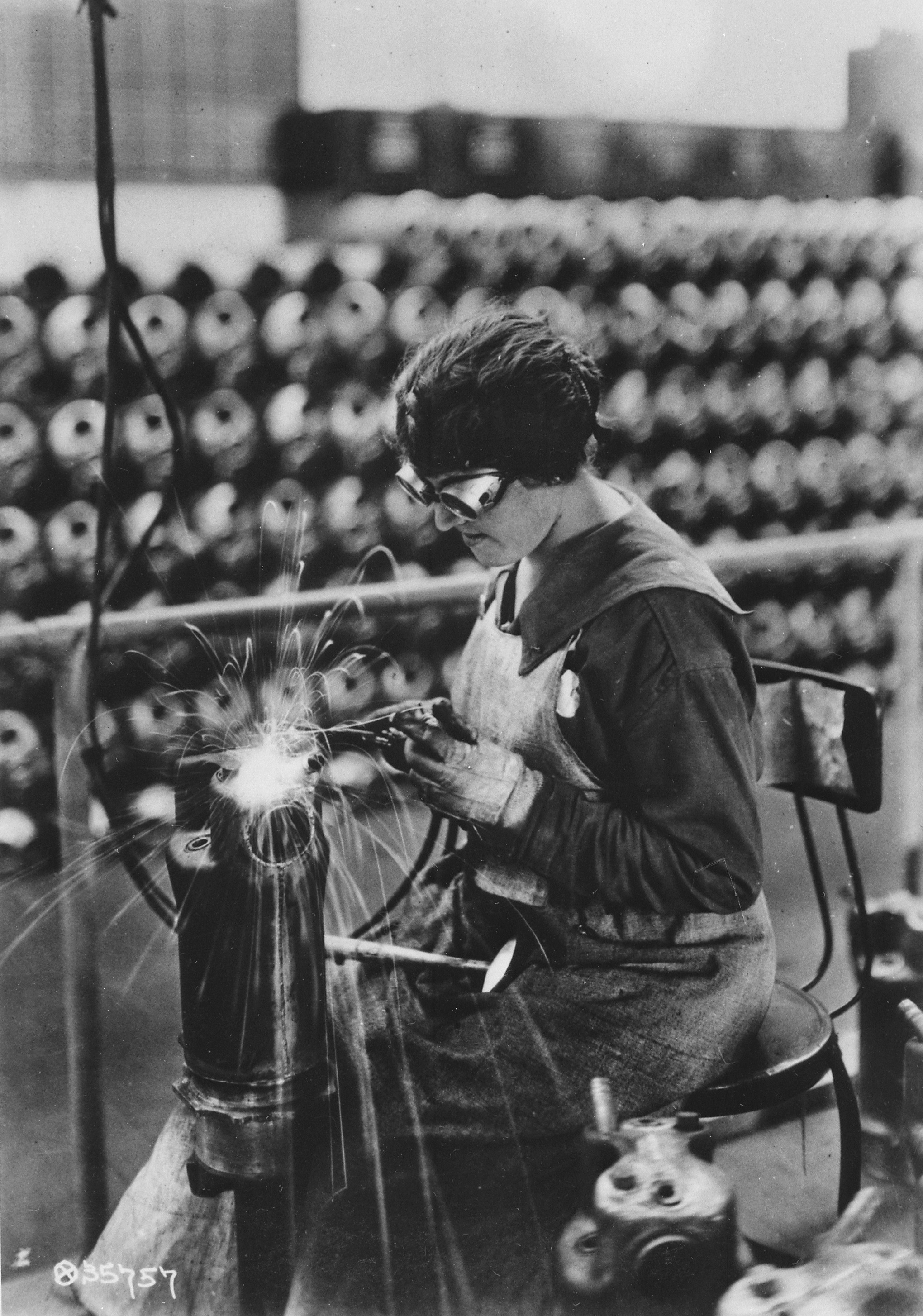
Acetylene welding on a cylinder water jacket, US Army 1918

World War I increased demand for military weaponry and caused a surge in industrial welding. Dutch aviation pioneer Anthony Fokker's business welded fuselages for the German Luftstreitkräfte. Due to a gas shortage, the British primarily used arc welding, and British shipbuilder Cammell Laird constructed the first ocean-going ship with an entirely welded hull, the Fullagar. American shipbuilders experimented with resistance welding before seeing the success that the British had with arc welding.

During the middle of the century, many new welding methods were invented, including the introduction of automatic welding in 1920, in which electrode wire was fed continuously. Shielding gas received much attention, as scientists attempted to protect welds from the effects of oxygen and nitrogen in the atmosphere. Porosity and brittleness were the primary problems, and the solutions that developed included the use of hydrogen, argon, and helium as welding atmospheres. Testing methods were introduced for weld integrity. First vibration testing was done using a hammer and stethoscope; later, X-ray tests were developed to see into the weld. During the 1930s, further advances allowed for the welding of reactive metals like aluminum and magnesium. This, in conjunction with developments in automatic welding, alternating current, and fluxes fed a major expansion of arc welding during the 1930s. Russian inventor Konstantin Khrenov implemented the first underwater electric arc welding. In 1930, Kyle Taylor was responsible for the release of stud welding, which soon became popular in shipbuilding and construction. Submerged arc welding was invented the same year. During World War II, submerged arc welding was widely used for ship-building because it allowed certain types of welds to be done twenty times faster than earlier techniques.

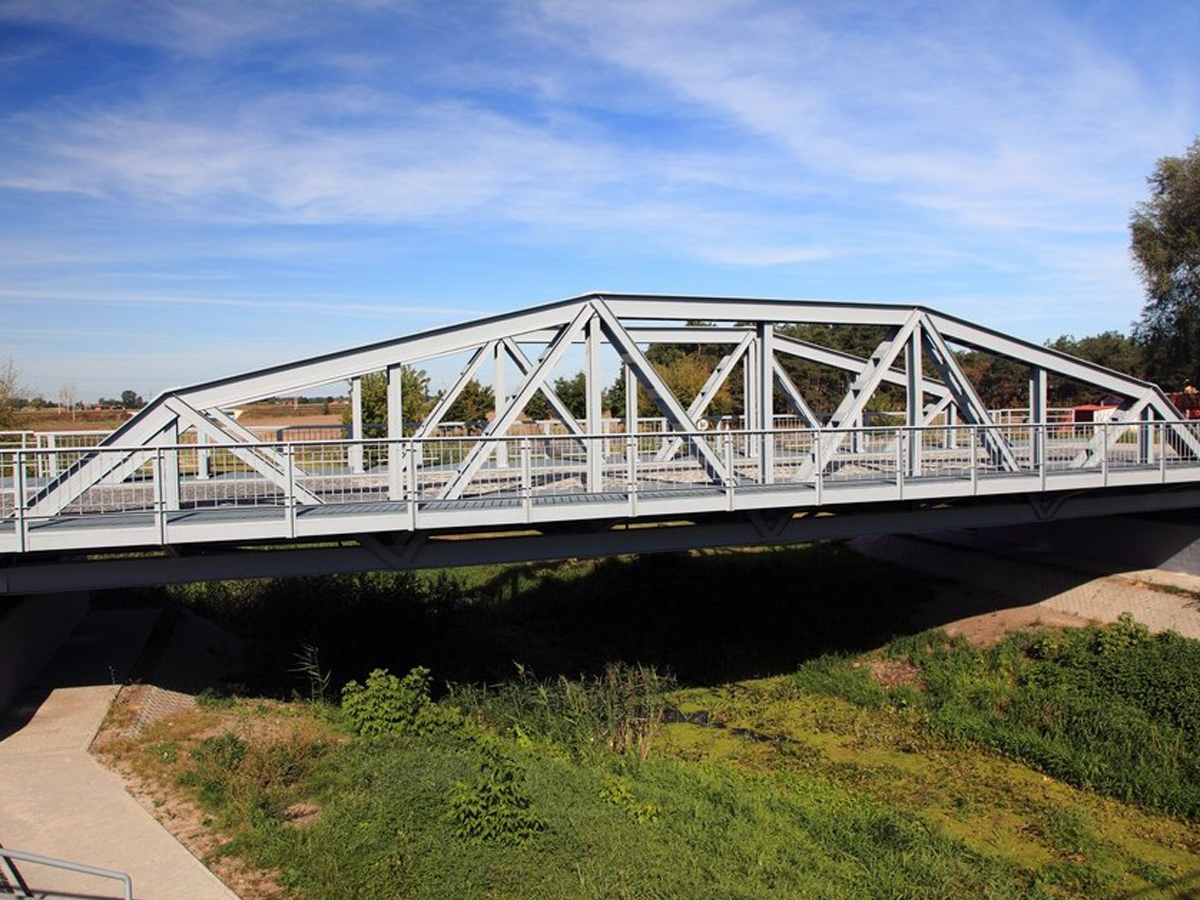
Bridge of Maurzyce

Improvements to welding processes opened up new possibilities for construction. Previously, large metal structures had been made from metals joined mechanically with rivets, along with bolts, screws, and belts. These connected but unfused metal structures had inherent weaknesses. The steamboat Sultana killed over a thousand passengers when its riveted boiler failed under pressure. Titanic sank due in part to failures in its riveted hull. In 1930, the first all-welded merchant vessel, M/S Carolinian, was launched. Time Magazine reported that using welds rather than rivets throughout the entire ship allowed a smaller team of nine workmen to construct the vessel in a fraction of the time, saving 75% of the cost and 77,000 pounds (35,000 kg) of steel rivets. The strength of welded steel also allowed for the creation of entirely new types of ships, notably the liquefied natural gas (LNG) tanker. The ASME Boiler and Pressure Vessel Code, created in response to deadly boiler failures, was used to develop the spherical tanks that contain LNG during transport. Also noteworthy is the first welded road bridge in the world, the Maurzyce Bridge in Poland (1928). Early skyscrapers and steel truss bridges were built from riveted steel beams. Welding allows for stronger and lighter structures and greater range of shapes, like the floating Beinecke Rare Book and Manuscript Library which draws structural integrity from its walls designed after the modernist rectangular trusses in a steel Vierendeel bridge. The Sydney Opera House's iconic shape is built on a stud-welded steel frame. The conjoined towers of the CCTV Headquarters looping skyscraper are welded to a skeleton of four-inch-thick plate steel sunk hundreds of feet underground into reinforced concrete.

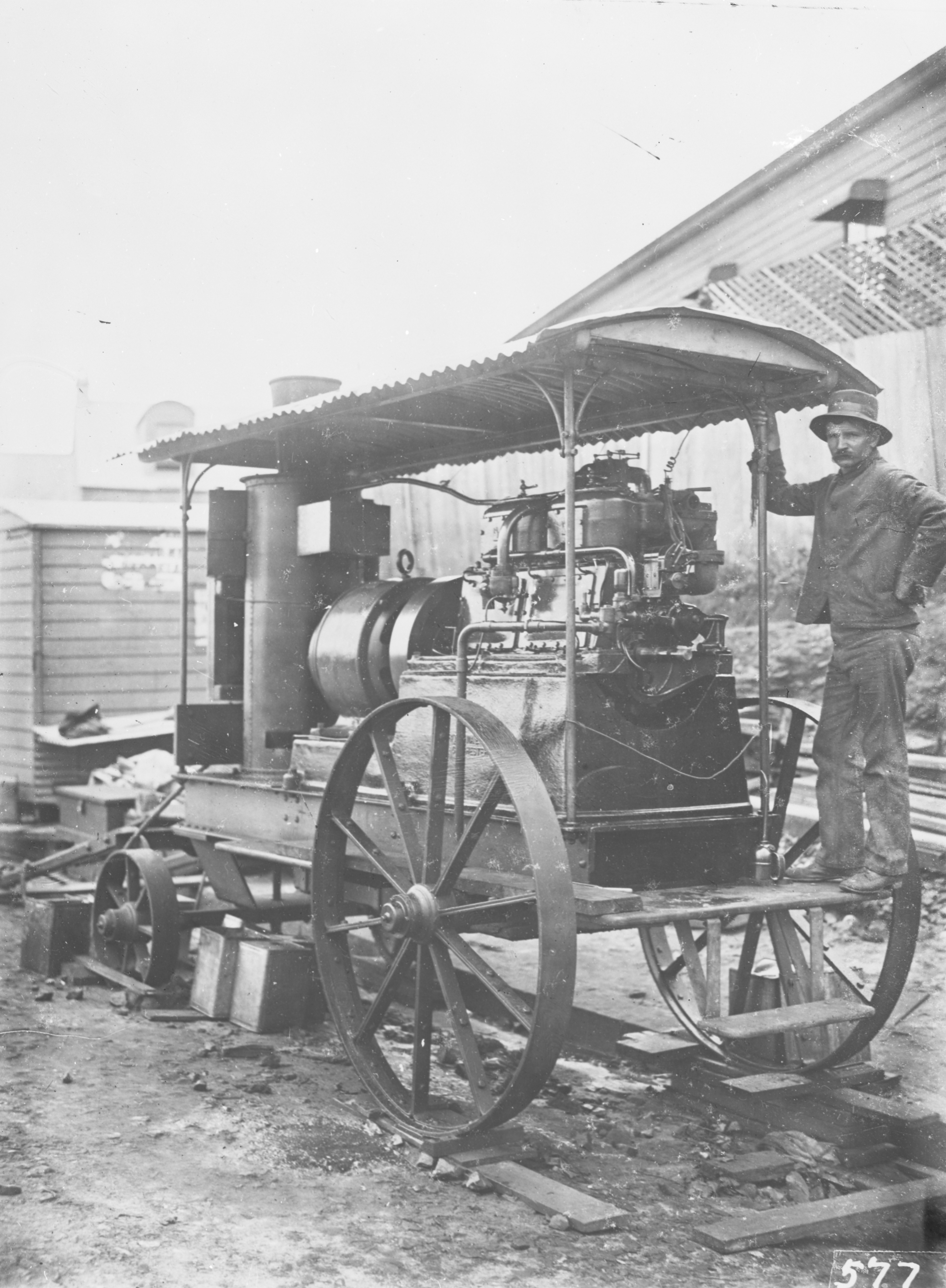
Portable welder being used for Sydney stormwater infrastructure

Gas tungsten arc welding, after decades of development, was finally perfected in 1941, and gas metal arc welding followed in 1948, allowing for fast welding of non-ferrous materials but requiring expensive shielding gases. Shielded metal arc welding was developed during the 1950s, using a flux-coated consumable electrode, and it quickly became the most popular metal arc welding process. In 1957, the flux-cored arc welding process debuted, in which the self-shielded wire electrode could be used with automatic equipment, resulting in greatly increased welding speeds, and that same year, plasma arc welding was invented by Robert Gage. Electroslag welding was introduced in 1958, and it was followed by its cousin, electrogas welding, in 1961. In 1953, the Soviet scientist N. F. Kazakov proposed the diffusion bonding method.

Other recent developments in welding include the 1958 breakthrough of electron beam welding, making deep and narrow welding possible through the concentrated heat source. Following the invention of the laser in 1960, laser beam welding debuted several decades later, and has proved to be especially useful in high-speed, automated welding. Magnetic pulse welding (MPW) has been industrially used since 1967. Friction stir welding was invented in 1991 by Wayne Thomas at The Welding Institute (TWI, UK) and found high-quality applications all over the world. All of these four new processes continue to be quite expensive due to the high cost of the necessary equipment, and this has limited their applications.

== Processes ==
Gas metal arc welding (GMAW) filmed through a shaded lens

Welding joins two pieces of metal using heat, pressure, or both. The most common modern welding methods use heat sufficient to melt the base metals to be joined and the filler metal. This includes gas welding and all forms of arc welding. The area where the base and filler metals melt is called the weld pool or puddle. The weld pool must be protected from oxygen in the air that will oxidize with the molten metal and from other gases that could contaminate the weld. Most welding methods involve pushing the puddle along a joint to create a weld bead. Overlapping pieces of metal can be joined by forming the weld pool within a hole made in the topmost piece of base metal to form a plug weld.

Solid-state welding processes join two pieces of metal using pressure. Electric resistance welding is a common industrial process that combines heat and pressure to join overlapping base metals without any filler material.

=== Gas welding ===
Diagram of oxy–fuel welding: 1. Torch tip; 2. Filler rod; 3. Flame (outer envelope); 4. Fusion; 5. Base metal; 6. Weld metal

Gas welding, also known as oxyacetylene welding, uses an open flame to generate heat and shield the weld. Compared to arc welding, the flame is less concentrated and lower in temperature, about 3,100 °C (5,610 °F) near the torch tip. This causes slower weld cooling, which can lead to greater residual stresses and weld distortion, though it eases the welding of high alloy steels. The diffuse outer envelope of the flame consumes oxygen before it can reach the molten weld pool. When working with easily oxidized metals, such as stainless steel, flux can be brushed onto the base metals.

The equipment is relatively inexpensive and simple, consisting of a torch, hoses, pressure regulators, a tank of oxygen, and a tank of fuel (usually acetylene). It is one of the oldest and most versatile welding processes, but it has become less popular in industrial applications. It is still widely used for welding pipes and tubes, as well as repair work. A similar process, generally called oxy–fuel cutting, is used to cut metals. Oxy–fuel equipment can also be used to heat metal before bending or straightening.

=== Arc welding ===
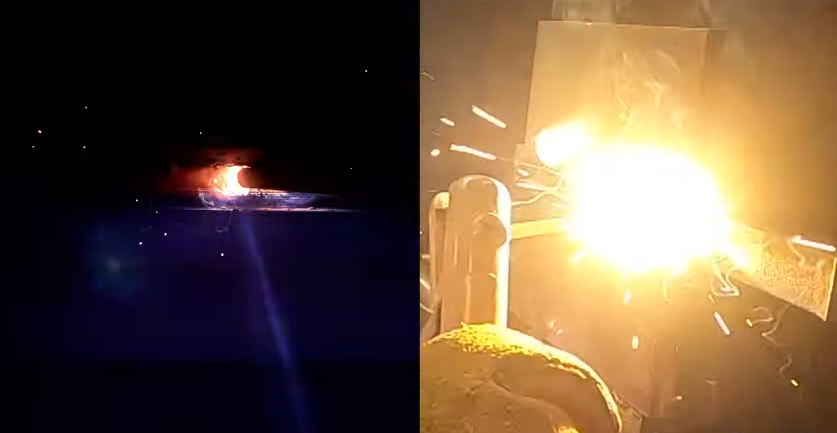
Welding seen from a welder's perspective through a shaded lens (left) and from the side without a shaded lens (right)

All arc welding processes use a welding power supply to create and maintain an electric arc between an electrode and the base material to melt metals at the welding point. Shielding gas prevents oxygen in the atmosphere from entering the molten weld pool. In some processes, the shielding gas is delivered from gas cylinders containing inert or semi-inert gas. In others, a flux coating on a consumable electrode disintegrates to create the gas. Filler material is typically added to the molten weld pool and is necessary for processes that use a consumable electrode.

==== Arc welding processes ====
Diagram of arc and weld area, in shielded metal arc welding: 1. Flux coating; 2. Core wire; 3. Shield gas; 4. Fusion; 5. Base metal; 6. Weld metal; 7. Solidified slag

One of the most common types of arc welding is shielded metal arc welding (SMAW); it is also known as manual metal arc welding (MMAW) or stick welding. Electric current is used to strike an arc between the base material and consumable electrode rod, which is made of filler material (typically steel) and is covered with a flux that protects the weld area from oxidation and contamination by producing carbon dioxide (CO_{2}) gas during the welding process. The electrode core itself acts as filler material, making a separate filler unnecessary.

The process is versatile and can be performed with relatively inexpensive equipment, making it well suited to shop jobs and field work. An operator can become reasonably proficient with a modest amount of training and can achieve mastery with experience. Weld times are rather slow, since the consumable electrodes must be frequently replaced and because slag, the residue from the flux, must be chipped away after welding. Furthermore, the process is generally limited to welding ferrous materials, though special electrodes have made possible the welding of cast iron, stainless steel, aluminum, and other metals.

Gas metal arc welding: 1. Travel; 2. Contact tube; 3. Electrode; 4. Shielding gas; 5. Fusion; 6. Weld metal; 7. Base metal

Gas metal arc welding (GMAW), also known as metal inert gas or MIG welding, is a semi-automatic or automatic process that uses a continuous wire feed as an electrode and an inert or semi-inert gas mixture to protect the weld from contamination. Since the electrode is continuous, welding speeds are greater for GMAW than for SMAW.

Flux-cored arc welding: 1. Flux core; 2. Tubular electrode; 3. Shield gas; 4. Fusion; 5. Base metal; 6. Weld metal; 7. Solidified slag

A related process, flux-cored arc welding (FCAW), uses similar equipment but employs wire consisting of a tubular steel electrode surrounding a powder fill material. This cored wire is more expensive than the standard solid wire and can generate fumes and slag, but it permits even higher welding speed and greater metal penetration. As the electrode is consumed, the flux disintegrates to create shielding gas and a protective layer of slag similar to stick welding. Some flux-cored machines have a nozzle that uses a shielding gas to supplement the protection from the flux. This is called dual shield welding, and uses a specialized gas-shielded flux-core wire.

Gas tungsten arc welding

Gas tungsten arc welding (GTAW), or tungsten inert gas (TIG) welding, is a manual welding process that uses a non-consumable tungsten electrode, an inert or semi-inert gas mixture, and a separate filler material. Especially useful for welding thin materials, this method is characterized by a stable arc and high-quality welds, but it requires significant operator skill and can only be accomplished at relatively low speeds.

GTAW can be used on nearly all weldable metals, though it is most often applied to stainless steel and light metals. It is often used when quality welds are extremely important, such as in bicycle, aircraft and naval applications. A related process, plasma arc welding, also uses a tungsten electrode but uses plasma gas to make the arc. The arc is more concentrated than the GTAW arc, making transverse control more critical and thus generally restricting the technique to a mechanized process. Because of its stable current, the method can be used on a wider range of material thicknesses than can the GTAW process and it is much faster. It can be applied to all of the same materials as GTAW except magnesium, and automated welding of stainless steel is one important application of the process. A variation of the process is plasma cutting, an efficient steel cutting process.

Submerged arc welding (SAW) is a high-productivity welding method in which the arc is struck beneath a covering layer of flux. This increases arc quality since contaminants in the atmosphere are blocked by the flux. The slag that forms on the weld generally comes off by itself, and combined with the use of a continuous wire feed, the weld deposition rate is high. Working conditions are much improved over other arc welding processes, since the flux hides the arc and almost no smoke is produced. The process is commonly used in industry, especially for large products and in the manufacture of welded pressure vessels. Other arc welding processes include atomic hydrogen welding, electroslag welding, electrogas welding, and stud arc welding.

==== Arc welding power supplies ====
To supply the electrical power necessary for arc welding processes, a variety of different power supplies can be used. The most common welding power supplies are constant current power supplies and constant voltage power supplies. In arc welding, the length of the arc is directly related to the voltage, and the amount of heat input is related to the current. Constant current power supplies are most often used for manual welding processes such as gas tungsten arc welding and shielded metal arc welding, because they maintain a relatively constant current even as the voltage varies. This is important because in manual welding, it can be difficult to hold the electrode perfectly steady, and as a result, the arc length and thus voltage tend to fluctuate. Constant voltage power supplies hold the voltage constant and vary the current, and as a result, are most often used for automated welding processes such as gas metal arc welding, flux-cored arc welding, and submerged arc welding. In these processes, arc length is kept constant, since any fluctuation in the distance between the wire and the base material is quickly rectified by a large change in current. For example, if the wire and the base material get too close, the current will rapidly increase, which in turn causes the heat to increase and the tip of the wire to melt, returning it to its original separation distance.

The type of current used plays an important role in arc welding. A welding power supply can use alternating current (AC) or direct current (DC). One disadvantage of AC—the fact that the arc must be re-ignited after every zero crossing—has been addressed with the invention of special power units that produce a square wave pattern instead of the normal sine wave, making rapid zero crossings possible and minimizing the effects of the problem.

For DC welding, the electrode can be connected to the machine's positive terminal (DCEP) or negative terminal (DCEN), changing the current's direction, or polarity. About 70% of the arc's heat is concentrated at its positive end. For DCEP this means 70% of the arc's heat is concentrated at the electrode. For DCEN 70% of the heat is at the workpiece, and for AC current, it is split evenly.

The metal, the welding process, and type of electrode will determine the current and polarity to be used. For example, because MIG welding uses such a thin consumable electrode, it is almost always done as DCEP. Flux-cored welding uses different flux material for consumable electrode wire meant for DCEN or DCEP. Stick welding is done with DCEP, DCEN, and alternating current with different rod types to match the current.

Non-consumable electrode processes, such as gas tungsten arc welding, can use either type of direct current, as well as alternating current. TIG welding on steel is typically done as DCEN. This prevents the intense heat from melting the electrode. With a larger, more heat-resistant electrode, DCEP or alternating current can be used for certain metals like magnesium, where electrons bombarding the workpiece clean the metal as they break up surface oxides via an electroetching process.

DCEN creates a deeper weld with more penetration for non-consumable electrode processes. Counter-intuitively, DCEP provides more penetration with consumable electrode processes. A consumable electrode, like a welding rod, melts into the weld pool and transfers heat to the workpiece.

=== Resistance welding ===
Resistance welding generates heat from electrical resistance in the base metals. Two electrodes are simultaneously used to press the metal sheets together and to pass current through the sheets. The electrodes are made from highly conductive material, usually copper. The higher resistance in the base metals causes small pools of molten metal to form at the weld area as high current (1,000–100,000 A) is passed through.

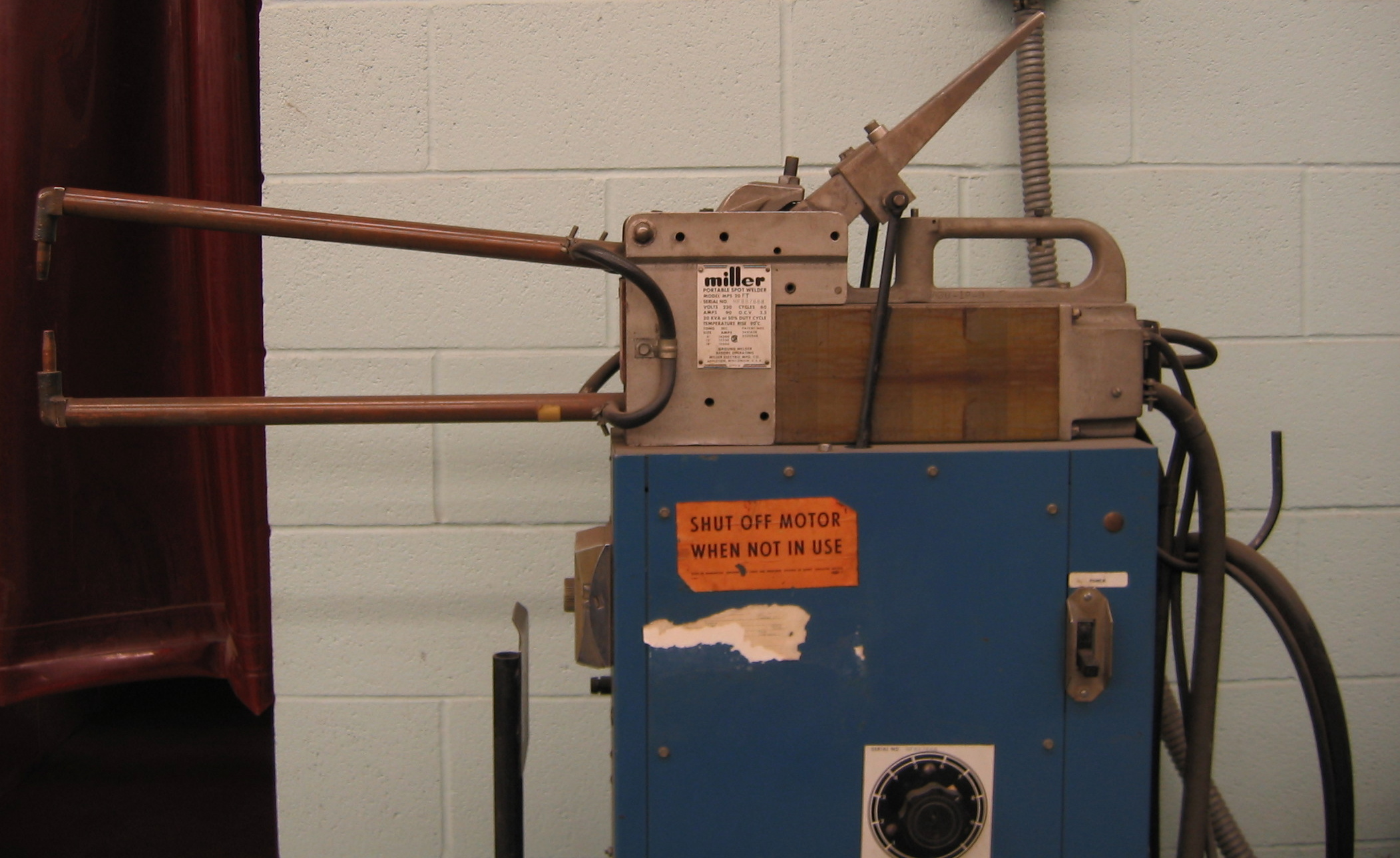
Spot welder

Resistance spot welding is a popular method used to join overlapping metal sheets of up to 3 mm thick. The advantages of the method include efficient energy use, limited workpiece deformation, high production rates, easy automation, and no required filler materials. Weld strength is significantly lower than with other welding methods, making the process suitable for only certain applications. It is used extensively in the automotive industry—ordinary cars can have several thousand spot welds made by industrial robots. In general, resistance welding methods are efficient and cause little pollution, but their applications are somewhat limited and the equipment cost can be high. A specialized process called shot welding can be used to spot weld stainless steel.

Seam welding also relies on two electrodes to apply pressure and current to join metal sheets. However, instead of pointed electrodes, wheel-shaped electrodes roll along and often feed the workpiece, making it possible to make long continuous welds. In the past, this process was used in the manufacture of beverage cans, but now its uses are more limited. Other resistance welding methods include butt welding, flash welding, projection welding, and upset welding.

=== Energy beam welding ===
Energy beam welding methods, namely laser beam welding and electron beam welding, are relatively new processes that have become quite popular in high production applications. The two processes are quite similar, differing most notably in their source of power. Laser beam welding employs a highly focused laser beam, while electron beam welding is done in a vacuum and uses an electron beam. Both have a very high energy density, making deep weld penetration possible and minimizing the size of the weld area. Both processes are extremely fast, and are easily automated, making them highly productive. The primary disadvantages are their very high equipment costs (though these are decreasing) and a susceptibility to thermal cracking. Developments in this area include laser-hybrid welding, which uses principles from both laser beam welding and arc welding for even better weld properties, laser cladding, and x-ray welding.

=== Solid-state welding ===
Solid-state welding processes classification chart

Like forge welding (the earliest welding process discovered), some modern welding methods do not involve the melting of the materials being joined. One of the most popular, ultrasonic welding, is used to connect thin sheets or wires made of metal or thermoplastic by vibrating them at high frequency and under high pressure. The equipment and methods involved are similar to that of resistance welding, but instead of electric current, vibration provides energy input. When welding metals, the vibrations are introduced horizontally, and the materials are not melted; with plastics, which should have similar melting temperatures, vertically. Ultrasonic welding is commonly used for making electrical connections out of aluminum or copper, and it is also a very common polymer welding process.

Another common process, explosion welding, involves the joining of materials by pushing them together under extremely high pressure. The energy from the impact plasticizes the materials, forming a weld, even though only a limited amount of heat is generated. The process is commonly used for welding dissimilar materials, including bonding aluminum to carbon steel in ship hulls and stainless steel or titanium to carbon steel in petrochemical pressure vessels.

Other solid-state welding processes include friction welding (including friction stir welding and friction stir spot welding), magnetic pulse welding, co-extrusion welding, cold welding, diffusion bonding, exothermic welding, high frequency welding, hot pressure welding, induction welding, and roll bonding.

== Geometry ==
Common welding joint types: 1. Square butt joint; 2. V butt joint; 3. Lap joint; 4. T-joint

Welds can be geometrically prepared in many different ways. The five basic types of weld joints are the butt joint, lap joint, corner joint, edge joint, and T-joint (a variant of this last is the cruciform joint). Other variations exist as well—for example, double-V preparation joints are characterized by the two pieces of material each tapering to a single center point at one-half their height. Single-U and double-U preparation joints are also fairly common—instead of having straight edges like the single-V and double-V preparation joints, they are curved, forming the shape of a U. Lap joints are also commonly more than two pieces thick—depending on the process used and the thickness of the material, many pieces can be welded together in a lap joint geometry.

Many welding processes require the use of a particular joint design; for example, resistance spot welding, laser beam welding, and electron beam welding are most frequently performed on lap joints. Other welding methods, like shielded metal arc welding, are extremely versatile and can weld virtually any type of joint. Some processes can also be used to make multipass welds, in which one weld is allowed to cool, and then another weld is performed on top of it. This allows for the welding of thick sections arranged in a single-V preparation joint, for example.

The cross-section of a welded butt joint, with the darkest gray representing the weld or fusion zone, the medium gray the heat-affected zone, and the lightest gray the base material.

After welding, a number of distinct regions can be identified in the weld area. The weld itself is called the fusion zone—more specifically, it is where the filler metal was laid during the welding process. The properties of the fusion zone depend primarily on the filler metal used, and its compatibility with the base materials. It is surrounded by the heat-affected zone, the area that had its microstructure and properties altered by the weld. These properties depend on the base material's behavior when subjected to heat. The metal in this area is often weaker than both the base material and the fusion zone, and is also where residual stresses are found.

== Quality ==
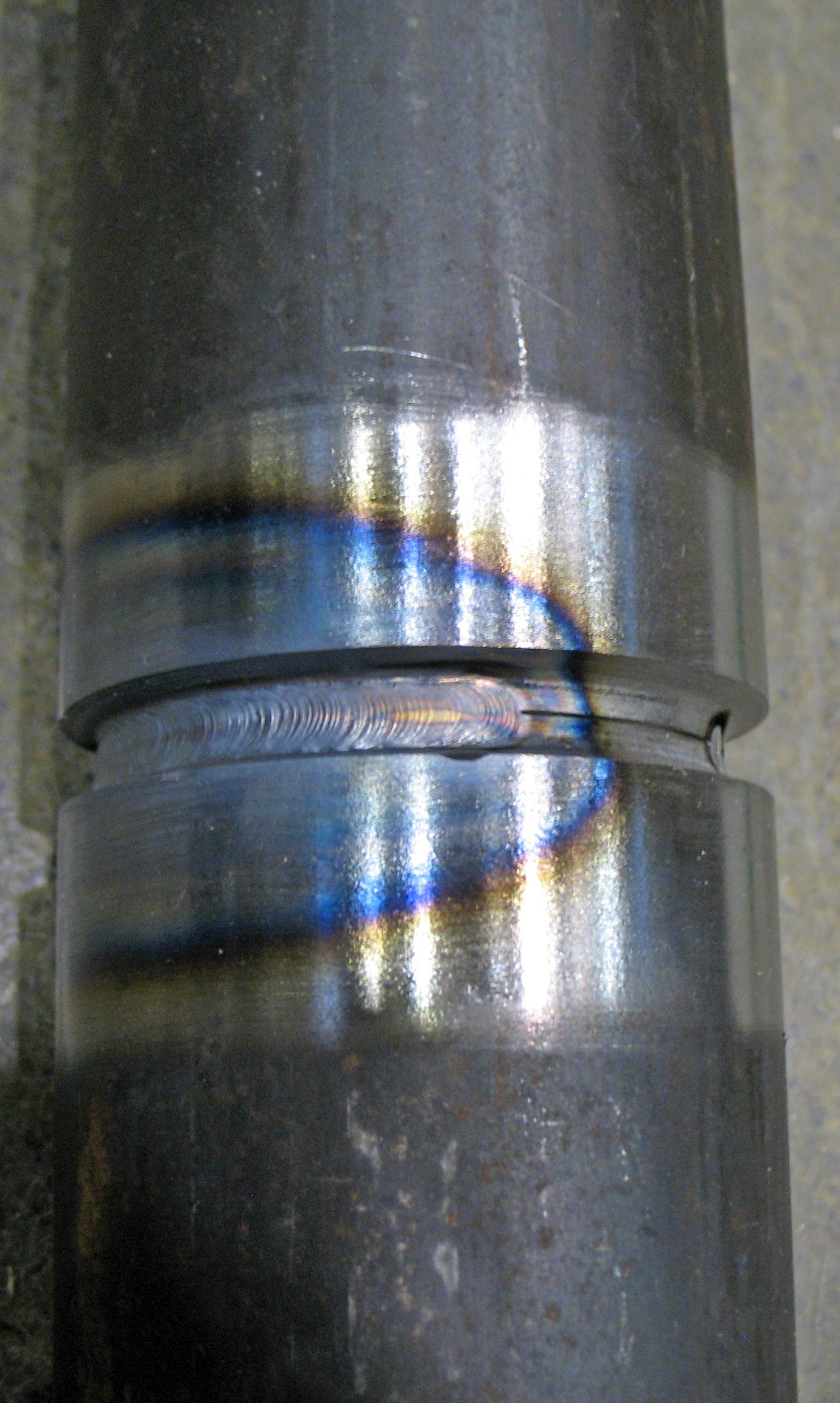
The blue area results from oxidation at a corresponding temperature of 600 °F (316 °C). This is an accurate way to identify temperature, but does not represent the HAZ width. The HAZ is the narrow area that immediately surrounds the welded base metal.

Many distinct factors influence the strength of welds and the material around them, including the welding method, the amount and concentration of energy input, the weldability of the base material, filler material, and flux material, the design of the joint, and the interactions between all these factors.

To test the quality of a weld, either destructive or nondestructive testing methods are commonly used to verify that welds are free of defects, have acceptable levels of residual stresses and distortion, and have acceptable heat-affected zone (HAZ) properties. Types of welding defects include cracks, distortion, gas inclusions (porosity), non-metallic inclusions, lack of fusion, incomplete penetration, lamellar tearing, and undercutting.

The metalworking industry has instituted codes and specifications to guide welders, weld inspectors, engineers, managers, and property owners in proper welding technique, design of welds, how to judge the quality of welding procedure specification, how to judge the skill of the person performing the weld, and how to ensure the quality of a welding job.

=== Heat-affected zone ===
The heat-affected zone (HAZ) is a ring surrounding the weld in which the temperature of the welding process, combined with the stresses of uneven heating and cooling, alters the heat-treatment properties of the alloy. The effects of welding on the material surrounding the weld can be detrimental—depending on the materials used and the heat input of the welding process used, the HAZ can be of varying size and strength. The thermal diffusivity of the base material plays a large role—if the diffusivity is high, the material cooling rate is high and the HAZ is relatively small. Conversely, a low diffusivity leads to slower cooling and a larger HAZ. The amount of heat injected by the welding process plays an important role as well, as processes like oxyacetylene welding have an unconcentrated heat input and increase the size of the HAZ. Processes like laser beam welding give a highly concentrated, limited amount of heat, resulting in a small HAZ. Arc welding falls between these two extremes, with the individual processes varying somewhat in heat input. To calculate the heat input for arc welding procedures, the following formula can be used:

$$Q = \left(\frac{V \times I \times 60}{S \times 1000} \right) \times
\mathit{Efficiency}$$

where Q = heat input (kJ/mm), V = voltage (V), I = current (A), and S = welding speed (mm/min). The efficiency is dependent on the welding process used, with shielded metal arc welding having a value of 0.75, gas metal arc welding and submerged arc welding, 0.9, and gas tungsten arc welding, 0.8. Methods of alleviating the stresses and brittleness created in the HAZ include stress relieving and tempering.

A potential defect concerning the HAZ is cracking where the weld meets the base metal. This can occur due to excess hydrogen in the weld, sensitive metals such as high-carbon steel, or stress from temperature change. Due to rapid expansion during welding (heating) and contraction afterward (cooling), the material may not be able to withstand the stress and could crack. HAZ cracks can appear as late as two days after welding. One method to control the stress is to control the heating and cooling rate, such as pre-heating and post-heating.

=== Lifetime extension with after treatment methods ===
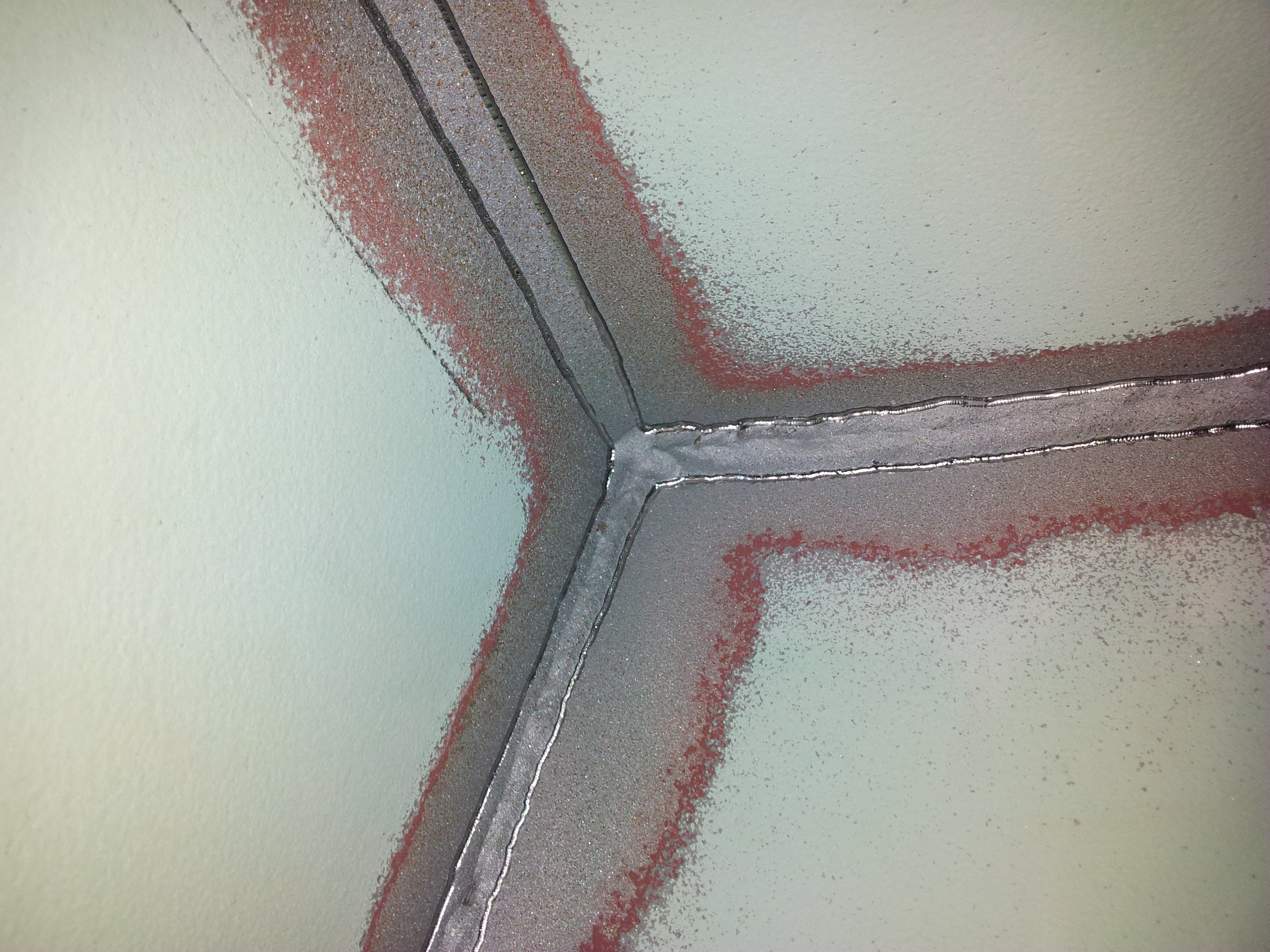
Example: High Frequency Impact Treatment for lifetime extension

Various post-weld treatments can increase the strength of a weld. Grinding a weld flat smooths the transition of stress between the weld and base metal, therefore increasing the fatigue lifetime of the joint. Peening the weld area, or striking it, compresses the surface, reducing internal stresses and improving corrosion resistance. Shot peening strikes the metal with a blast of round metal pellets, similar to birdshot inside a shotgun shell, and is more effective than peening with a hammer. Another treatment that compresses a weld via impact is high-frequency impact treatment (HFMI), where rapid impacts smooth and harden the weld surface. Ultrasonic impact treatment is a form of HFMI that combines mechanical impact with ultrasonic vibration.

== Metallurgy ==
Most engineering materials consist of crystalline solids in which the atoms or ions are arranged in a repetitive geometric pattern which is known as a lattice structure, with notable exceptions in glass and amorphous polymers.

Crystalline solids' cohesion comes from chemical bonds formed between the atoms. Chemical bonds are typically categorized as ionic or covalent. In an ionic bond, an electron separates from one atom and becomes attached to another atom to form oppositely charged ions. Covalent bonding occurs when two or more atoms share electrons. In both ionic and covalent bonding, the positions of the ions and electrons are constrained relative to each other, making such materials characteristically brittle.

Metallic bonding is a type of chemical bonding that occurs between metal atoms. Atoms will lose electrons that are shared among an array of positive ions. These mobile electrons are free to move across the lattice of ions. This gives metals their relatively high thermal and electrical conductivity and makes them characteristically ductile, able to bend before cracking. Ductility is an important factor in ensuring the integrity of structures by enabling them to sustain local stress concentrations without fracture. In addition, structures are required to be of an acceptable strength, which is related to a material's yield strength. In general, as the yield strength of a material increases, there is a corresponding reduction in fracture toughness.

A reduction in fracture toughness may also be attributed to the embrittlement effect of impurities, or for body-centered cubic metals, to a reduction in temperature. Many metals, in particular steels, have a transitional temperature range above which they have acceptable notch-ductility and below which they become brittle. Within the transition region, fracture behavior becomes less predictable. The reduction in fracture toughness is accompanied by a change in the fracture appearance. When above the transition, the fracture is primarily due to micro-void coalescence, which results in the fracture appearing fibrous. When the temperature falls, the fracture will show signs of cleavage facets. These two appearances are visible to the naked eye. Brittle fracture in steel plates may appear as chevron markings. These arrow-like ridges on the crack surface point towards the origin of the fracture.

Fracture toughness is measured using standardized notched and fatigue-precracked specimens, of which the dimensions are specified by standards such as ASTM E399. Fracture toughness and related toughness properties may also be evaluated using:

- the Charpy impact test per ASTM A370,
- the crack-tip opening displacement (CTOD) test per BS 7448–1,
- the J integral test per ASTM E1820, and
- the Pellini drop-weight test per ASTM E208.

== Unusual conditions ==
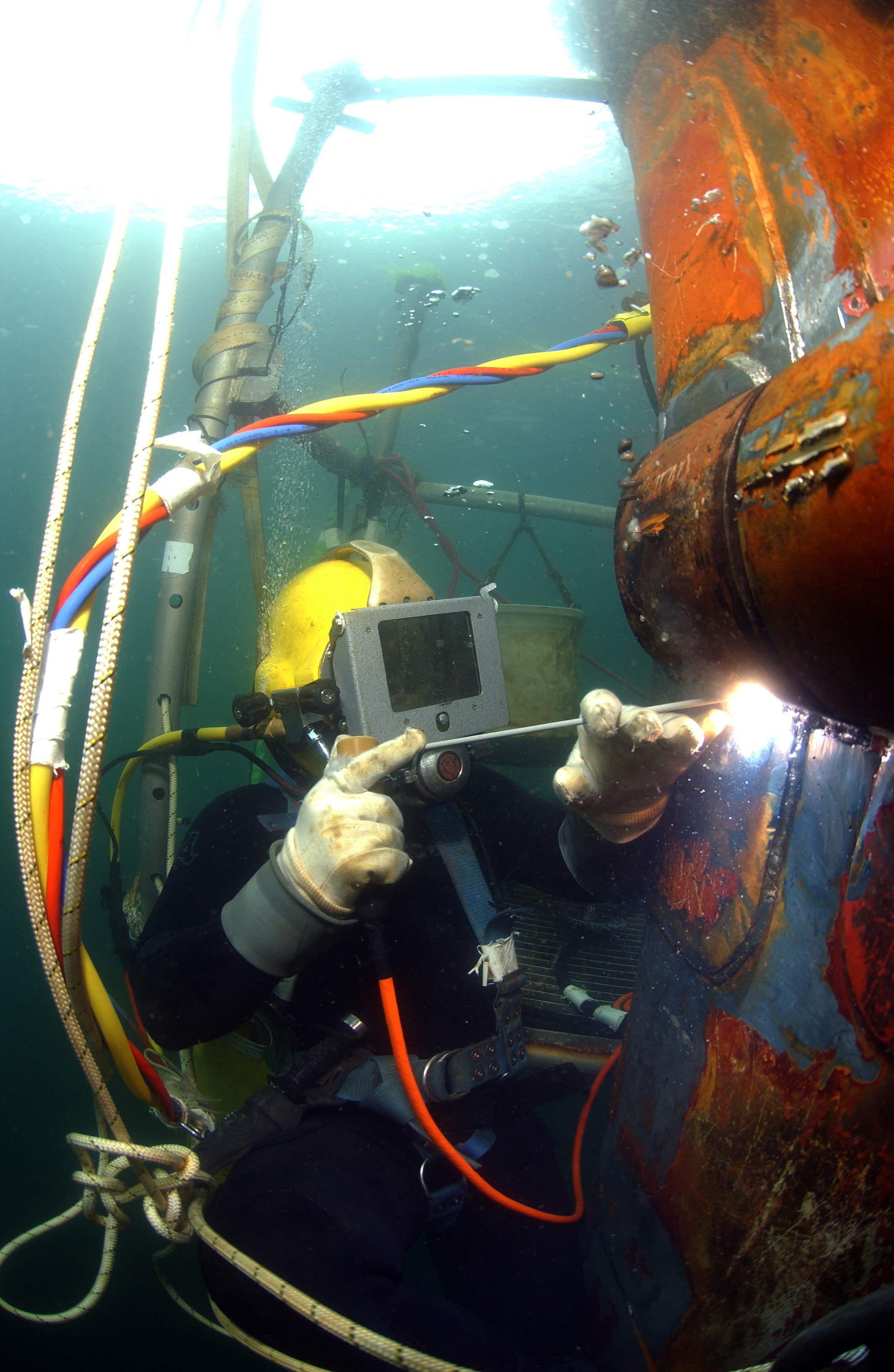
Underwater welding

While many welding applications are done in controlled environments such as factories and repair shops, some welding processes are commonly used in a wide variety of conditions, such as open air, underwater, and vacuums (such as space). In open-air applications, such as construction and outdoors repair, shielded metal arc welding is the most common process. Processes that employ inert gases to protect the weld cannot be readily used in such situations, because unpredictable atmospheric movements can result in a faulty weld. Shielded metal arc welding is also often used in underwater welding in the construction and repair of ships, offshore platforms, and pipelines, but others, such as flux cored arc welding and gas tungsten arc welding, are also common. Welding in space is also possible—it was first attempted in 1969 by Russian cosmonauts during the Soyuz 6 mission, when they performed experiments to test shielded metal arc welding, plasma arc welding, and electron beam welding in a depressurized environment. Further testing of these methods was done in the following decades, and today researchers continue to develop methods for using other welding processes in space, such as laser beam welding, resistance welding, and friction welding. Advances in these areas may be useful for future endeavors similar to the construction of the International Space Station, which could rely on welding for joining in space the parts that were manufactured on Earth.

== Safety issues ==
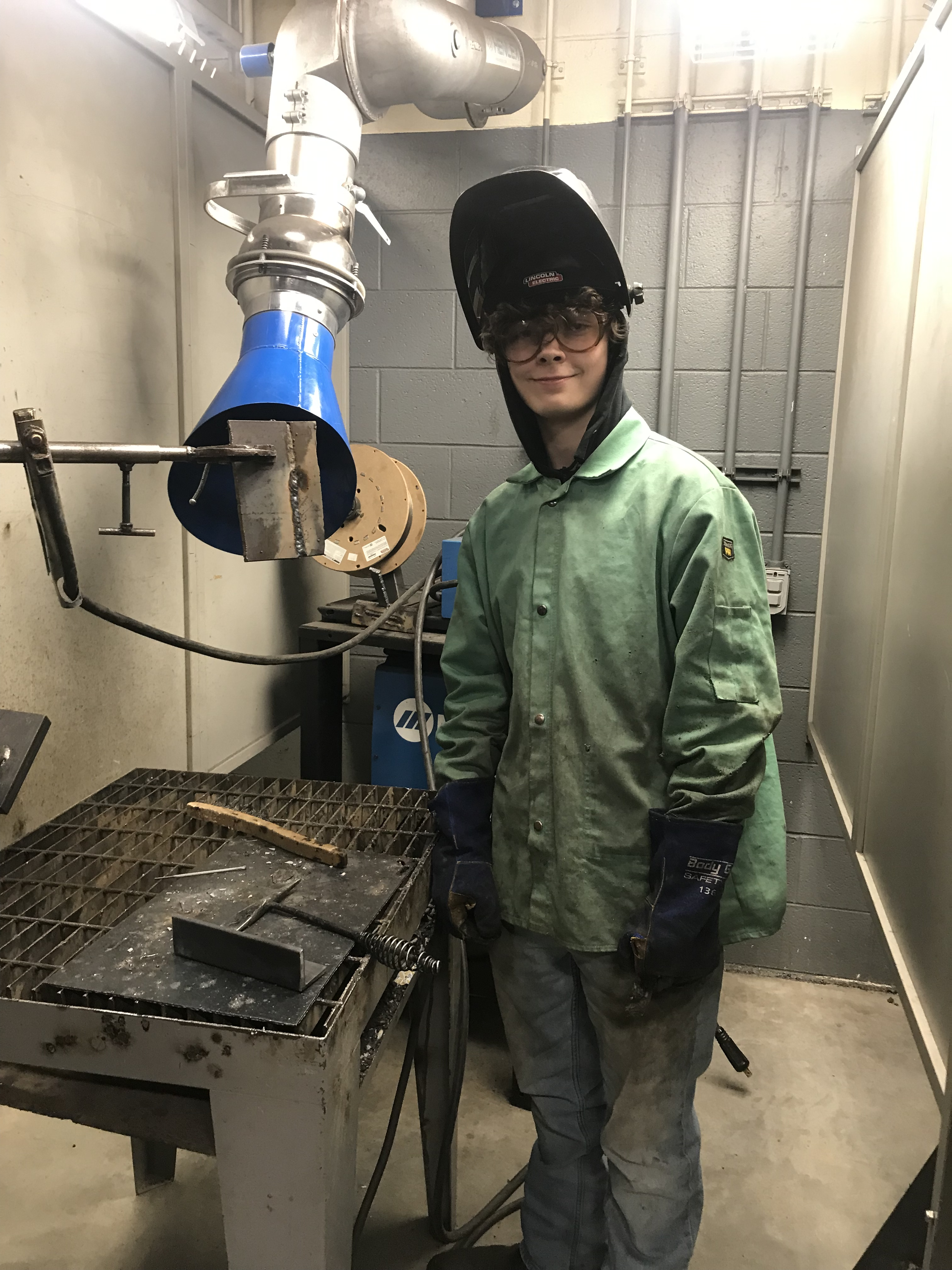
A stick welding booth equipped with local exhaust system (LEV) that removes the toxic fumes, gases, vapors and dusts before they can mix with the room air. Besides toxic emissions, the booth also helps protect bystanders from UV light. With a well-ventilated booth, personal protective equipment is still needed for the welder.

Welding can be dangerous and unhealthy if the proper precautions are not taken. Potential safety risks come from fumes, ultraviolet radiation, heat, electric currents, and vibrations. New technology, safe work practices, and proper protection reduce the risks of injury or death from welding. Welding on stainless steel and other chromium-containing alloy steels can expose workers to hexavalent chromium compounds. The Occupational Safety and Health Administration identifies such hot work as a major source of occupational Cr(VI) exposure; Cr(VI) is carcinogenic and can affect the respiratory system, kidneys, liver, skin, and eyes.

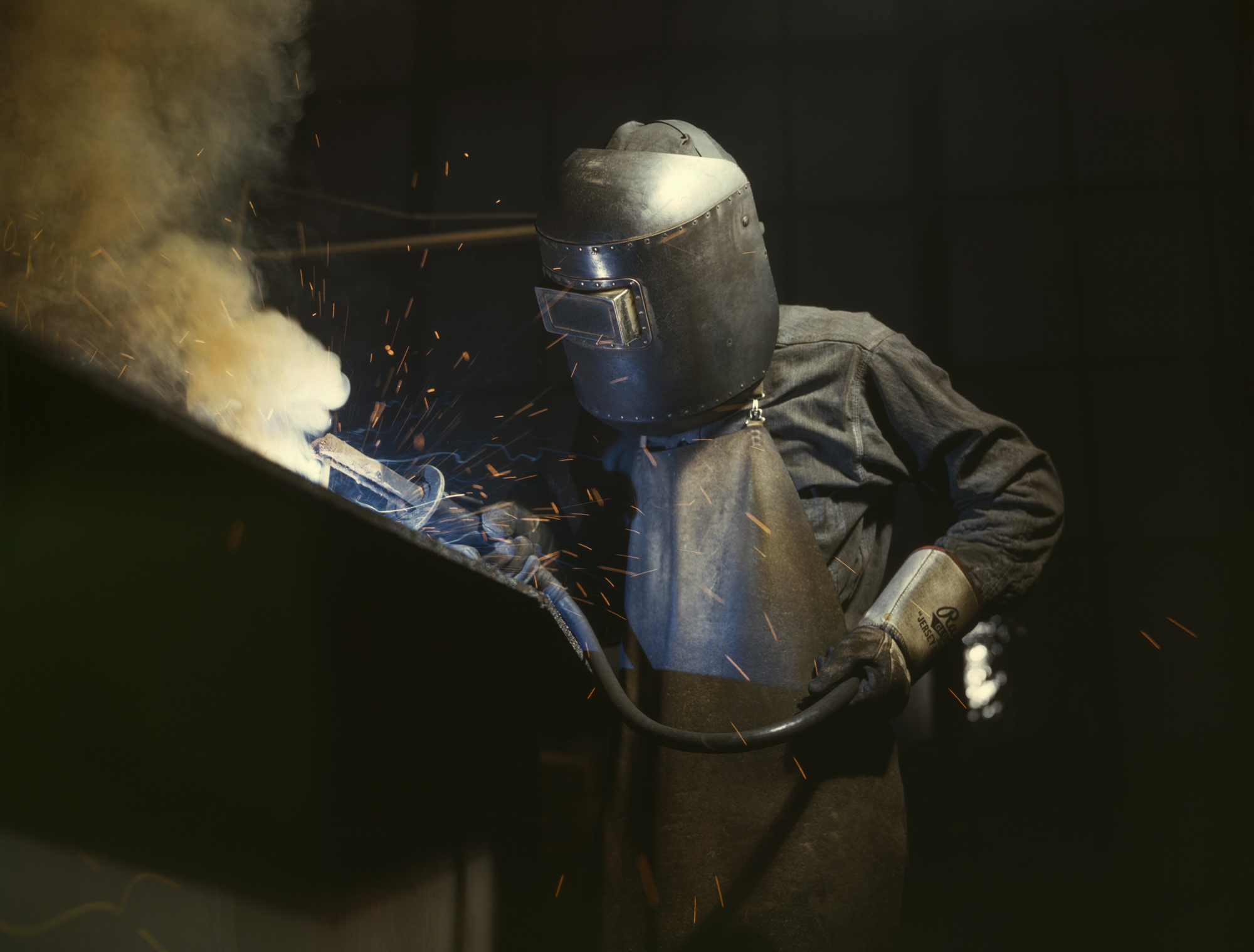
Arc welding with a welding helmet, gloves, and other protective clothing (1942)

Since many common welding procedures involve an open flame or electric arc, the risk of burns and fire is significant; this is why it is classified as a hot work process. To prevent injury, welders wear personal protective equipment in the form of heavy leather gloves and protective long-sleeve jackets to avoid exposure to extreme heat and flames. Synthetic clothing such as polyester should not be worn. Wool is less flammable than cotton, but dense cotton fabrics such as denim are still sufficient for clothing. However, any molten material that splatters onto synthetic material will melt directly through the fabric resulting in severe burns. The use of compressed gases and flames in many welding processes poses an explosion and fire risk. Some common precautions include limiting the amount of oxygen in the air, and keeping combustible materials away from the workplace.

Arc welding produces intense visible and ultraviolet light. Typical gas metal arc welding has an irradiance of 5W/m^{2} for the welder, which is many times brighter than sunlight. This can cause a condition called arc eye or flash burns, in which ultraviolet light causes inflammation of the cornea, and can burn the retinas of the eyes. Welding helmets with dark UV-filtering face plates are worn to prevent this exposure. Many helmets include an auto-darkening face plate, which instantly darkens upon exposure to the intense UV light. To protect bystanders, the welding area is often surrounded by translucent welding curtains. These curtains, made of a polyvinyl chloride plastic film, shield people outside the welding area from the UV light of the electric arc, but they cannot replace the filter glass used in helmets. The light can also burn exposed skin. Because of the less intense light produced in oxy–fuel welding, goggles that use less UV filtering and do not protect the entire face are sufficient.

Depending on the type of material, welding varieties, and other factors, welding can produce over 100 dB(A) of noise. Above 85 dB(A), earplugs should be worn. Long-term or continuous exposure to higher decibels can lead to noise-induced hearing loss. Processes that produce vibrations sufficient to numb a welder's hands are automated because PPE cannot offer sufficient protection.

A video describing research on welding helmets and their ability to limit fume exposure

Welders are also often exposed to potentially harmful particulate matter and gases, such as carbon monoxide, carbon dioxide, and ozone. Natural ventilation can lower the levels of most gases, but without active ventilation and respirators fitted with ozone filters, ozone levels are likely to exceed safe limits. Processes like flux-cored arc welding and shielded metal arc welding produce smoke containing particles of various types of oxides.

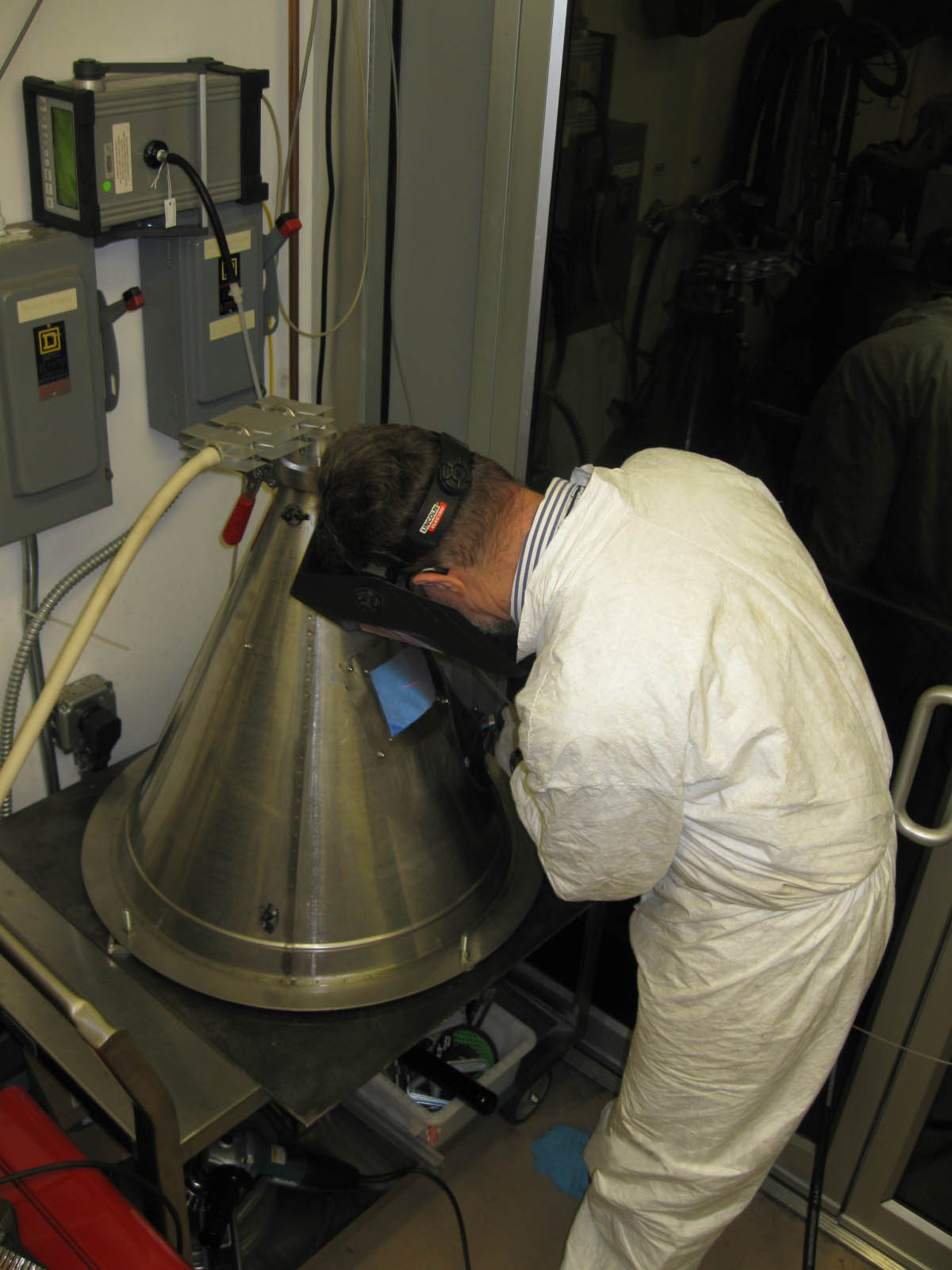
A chamber designed to contain welding fumes for analysis

The size of the aerosol particles affects the toxicity of the fumes, with smaller particles presenting a greater danger. Most of the particles in welding fumes range from 100 nanometers (nm) to 1 micrometer (μm). They can be easily inhaled, embedding themselves in olfactory and respiratory tissues. Particles with a diameter of 10 μm or greater are likely to stick to the mucus lining the nose and throat, where they can be expelled in coughs and sneezes. Below 10 μm in diameter, particles can reach the lungs. As the diameter of the particle decreases the deposition rate in the alveoli increases. Nanoparticles can become trapped in the alveolar macrophages of the lungs. Lung fibrosis, the scarring of lung tissue, can result and develop into lung cancer. Ultrafine particles less than 0.1 μm in diameter can translocate across the blood–brain barrier and cause adverse neurological effects. Particles in welding fumes can be as small as 0.005μm. Flux, heat, electric current, and the type of metal all impact the amount and size of breathable fume particles.

Exposure to manganese welding fumes, for example, even at low levels (<0.2 mg/m^{3}), may cause neurological problems or damage to the lungs, liver, kidneys, or central nervous system. A 2006 study exposed rats to simulated welding fumes (manganese oxide aerosols) and tracked the flow of the pollutants from initial presence in the olfactory bulb into the striatum, cortex, and cerebellum.

There are several technologies to mitigate dangers from welding fumes. Local exhaust ventilation (LEV) solutions remove fumes, smoke, and dust directly from the welding area. Forms of LEV include downdraft benches, fume hoods, and fume extraction welding guns. Downdraft benches have exhaust ducts beneath the metal welding table. Fume extraction guns have a vacuum hose that runs down to the welding nozzle. Movable fume hoods can be positioned directly over the welding area. Even with ventilation, there are still respiratory risks that respirators can further reduce. Studies have shown that respirators, such as half-mask elastomeric respirators and powered air-purifying respirators, significantly decrease particulate inhalation.

== Costs and trends ==
As an industrial process, the cost of welding plays a crucial role in manufacturing decisions. Many different variables affect the total cost, including equipment cost, labor cost, material cost, and energy cost. Depending on the process, equipment cost can vary, from inexpensive for methods like shielded metal arc welding and oxy–fuel welding, to extremely expensive for methods like laser beam welding and electron beam welding. Because of their high cost, they are only used in high production operations. Similarly, because automation and robots increase equipment costs, they are only implemented when high production is necessary. Labor cost depends on the deposition rate (the rate of welding), the hourly wage, and the total operation time, including time spent fitting, welding, and handling the part. The cost of materials includes the cost of the base and filler material, and the cost of shielding gases. Finally, energy cost depends on arc time and welding power demand.

For manual welding methods, labor costs generally make up the vast majority of the total cost. As a result, many cost-saving measures are focused on minimizing operation time. To do this, welding procedures with high deposition rates can be selected, and weld parameters can be fine-tuned to increase welding speed. Mechanization and automation are often implemented to reduce labor costs, but this frequently increases the cost of equipment and creates additional setup time. Material costs tend to increase when special properties are necessary, and energy costs normally do not amount to more than several percent of the total welding cost.

In recent years, in order to minimize labor costs in high production manufacturing, industrial welding has become increasingly more automated, most notably with the use of robots in resistance spot welding (especially in the automotive industry) and in arc welding. In robot welding, mechanized devices both hold the material and perform the weld and at first, spot welding was its most common application, but robotic arc welding increases in popularity as technology advances. Other key areas of research and development include the welding of dissimilar materials (such as steel and aluminum, for example) and new welding processes, such as friction stir, magnetic pulse, conductive heat seam, and laser-hybrid welding. Furthermore, progress is desired in making more specialized methods like laser beam welding practical for more applications, such as in the aerospace and automotive industries. Researchers also hope to better understand the often unpredictable properties of welds, especially microstructure, residual stresses, and a weld's tendency to crack or deform.

The trend of accelerating the speed at which welds are performed in the steel erection industry comes at a risk to the integrity of the connection. Without proper fusion to the base materials provided by sufficient arc time on the weld, a project inspector cannot ensure the effective diameter of the puddle weld therefore he or she cannot guarantee the published load capacities unless they witness the actual installation. These arc spot welds, also known as puddle welds, have become a common way of attaching steel decking to bar joist. According to the American Welding Society, arc spot welds should be "restricted to the welding of sheet steel to supporting structural member in the flat position" with combined sheet thickness below .15 inches (3.8 mm). Experiments indicate that published equations for arc spot weld strength can both overestimate and, more often, underestimate the strength of the bond.

== Plastic welding ==
Plastics are generally divided into two categories, which are "thermosets" and "thermoplastics." A thermoset is a plastic in which a chemical reaction sets the molecular bonds after first forming the plastic, and then the bonds cannot be broken again without degrading the plastic. Thermosets cannot be melted. Therefore, once a thermoset has set it is impossible to weld it. Examples of thermosets include epoxies, silicone, vulcanized rubber, polyester, and polyurethane.

Thermoplastics, by contrast, form long molecular chains, which are often coiled or intertwined, forming an amorphous structure without any long-range, crystalline order. Some thermoplastics may be fully amorphous, while others have a partially crystalline/partially amorphous structure. Both amorphous and semicrystalline thermoplastics have a glass transition, above which welding can occur, but semicrystallines also have a specific melting point which is above the glass transition. Above this melting point, the viscous liquid will become a free-flowing liquid (see rheological weldability for thermoplastics). Examples of thermoplastics include polyethylene, polypropylene, polystyrene, polyvinyl chloride (PVC), and fluoroplastics like Teflon and Spectralon.

Welding thermoplastic with heat is very similar to welding glass. The plastic first must be cleaned and then heated through the glass transition, turning the weld interface into a thick, viscous liquid. Two heated interfaces can then be pressed together, allowing the molecules to mix through intermolecular diffusion, joining them as one. Then the plastic is cooled through the glass transition, allowing the weld to solidify. A filler rod may often be used for certain types of joints. The main differences in welding plastic are the types of heating methods, the much lower melting temperatures, and the fact that plastics will burn if overheated. Many different methods have been devised for heating plastic to a weldable temperature without burning it. Ovens or electric heating tools can be used to melt the plastic. Ultrasonic, laser, or friction heating are other methods. Resistive metals may be implanted in the plastic, which respond to induction heating. Some plastics will begin to burn at temperatures lower than their glass transition, so welding can be performed by blowing a heated, inert gas onto the plastic, melting it while, at the same time, shielding it from oxygen.

=== Solvent welding ===
Many thermoplastics can also be welded using chemical solvents. When placed in contact with the plastic, the solvent will begin to soften it, bringing the surface into a thick, liquid solution. When two melted surfaces are pressed together, the molecules in the solution mix, joining them as one. Because the solvent can permeate the plastic, the solvent evaporates out through the surface of the plastic, causing the weld to drop out of solution and solidify. A common use for solvent welding is for joining PVC (polyvinyl chloride) or ABS (acrylonitrile butadiene styrene) pipes during plumbing, or for welding styrene and polystyrene plastics in the construction of models. Solvent welding is especially effective on plastics like PVC, which burn at or below their glass transition, but may be ineffective on plastics like Teflon or polyethylene that are resistant to chemical decomposition.

== See also ==
- Aluminum joining
- Fasteners
- List of welding codes
- List of welding processes
- List of tools for welding and metalwork
- Welding Procedure Specification
- Welder certification
- Welded sculpture
- Welding table
