= Diffusion bonding =

Solid-state welding technique

Diffusion bonding or diffusion welding is a solid-state welding technique used in metalworking, capable of joining similar and dissimilar metals. It operates on the principle of solid-state diffusion, wherein the atoms of two solid, metallic surfaces intersperse themselves over time. This is typically accomplished at an elevated temperature, approximately 50-75% of the absolute melting temperature of the materials. A weak bond can also be achieved at room temperature. Diffusion bonding is usually implemented by applying high pressure, in conjunction with necessarily high temperature, to the materials to be welded; the technique is most commonly used to weld "sandwiches" of alternating layers of thin metal foil, and metal wires or filaments. Currently, the diffusion bonding method is widely used in the joining of high-strength and refractory metals within the aerospace and nuclear industries.

== History ==
The act of diffusion welding is centuries old. This can be found in the form of "gold-filled," a technique used to bond gold and copper for use in jewelry and other applications. In order to create filled gold, smiths would begin by hammering out an amount of solid gold into a thin sheet of gold foil. This film was then placed on top of a copper substrate and weighted down. Finally, using a process known as "hot-pressure welding" or HPW, the weight/copper/gold-film assembly was placed inside an oven and heated until the gold film was sufficiently bonded to the copper substrate.

Modern methods were described by the Soviet scientist N.F. Kazakov in 1953.

== Characteristics ==
Diffusion bonding involves no liquid fusion, and often no filler metal. No weight is added to the total, and the join tends to exhibit both the strength and temperature resistance of the base metal(s). The materials endure no, or very little, plastic deformation. Very little residual stress is introduced, and there is no contamination from the bonding process. It may theoretically be performed on a join surface of any size with no increase in processing time, however, practically speaking, the surface tends to be limited by the pressure required and physical limitations. Diffusion bonding may be performed with similar and dissimilar metals, reactive and refractory metals, or pieces of varying thicknesses.

Due to its relatively high cost, diffusion bonding is most often used for jobs either difficult or impossible to weld by other means. Examples include welding materials normally impossible to join via liquid fusion, such as zirconium and beryllium; materials with very high melting points such as tungsten; alternating layers of different metals which must retain strength at high temperatures; and very thin, honeycombed metal foil structures. Titanium alloys will often be diffusion bonded as the thin oxide layer can be dissolved and diffused away from the bonding surfaces at temperatures over 850 °C.

== Temperature Dependence ==
Steady state diffusion is determined by the amount of diffusion flux that passes through the cross-sectional area of the mating surfaces. Fick's first law of diffusion states:

$$J = -D(dC/dx),$$

where J is the diffusion flux, D is a diffusion coefficient, and dC/dx is the concentration gradient through the materials in question. The negative sign is a product of the gradient. Another form of Fick's law states:

$$J = M/(At),$$

where M is defined as either the mass or amount of atoms being diffused, A is the cross-sectional area, and t is the time required. Equating the two equations and rearranging, we achieve the following result:

$$t = -(1/D)(M/A)(dC/dx)^{-1}.$$

As mass and area are constant for a given joint, time required is largely dependent on the concentration gradient, which changes by only incremental amounts through the joint, and the diffusion coefficient. The diffusion coefficient is determined by the equation:

$$D = D_0 e^{-Q_\text{d}/RT},$$

where Q_{d} is the activation energy for diffusion, R is the universal gas constant, T is the thermodynamic temperature experienced during the process, and D_{0} is a temperature-independent preexponential factor that depends on the materials being joined. For a given joint, the only term in this equation within control is temperature.

== Processes ==
Animation of Diffusion Bonding Process

When joining two materials of similar crystalline structure, diffusion bonding is performed by clamping the two pieces to be welded with their surfaces abutting each other. Prior to welding, these surfaces must be machined to as smooth a finish as economically viable, and kept as free from chemical contaminants or other detritus as possible. Any intervening material between the two metallic surfaces may prevent adequate diffusion of material. Specific tooling is made for each welding application to mate the welder to the workpieces. Once clamped, pressure and heat are applied to the components, usually for many hours. The surfaces are heated either in a furnace, or via electrical resistance. Pressure can be applied using a hydraulic press at temperature; this method allows for exact measurements of load on the parts. In cases where the parts must have no temperature gradient, differential thermal expansion can be used to apply load. By fixturing parts using a low-expansion metal (i.e. molybdenum) the parts will supply their own load by expanding more than the fixture metal at temperature. Alternative methods for applying pressure include the use of dead weights, differential gas pressure between the two surfaces, and high-pressure autoclaves. Diffusion bonding must be done in a vacuum or inert gas environment when using metals that have strong oxide layers (i.e. copper). Surface treatment including polishing, etching, and cleaning as well as diffusion pressure and temperature are important factors regarding the process of diffusion bounding.

At the microscopic level, diffusion bonding occurs in three simplified stages:

- Microasperity deformation- before the surfaces completely contact, asperities (very small surface defects) on the two surfaces contact and plastically deform. As these asperities deform, they interlink, forming interfaces between the two surfaces.
- Diffusion-controlled mass transport- elevated temperature and pressure causes accelerated creep in the materials; grain boundaries and raw material migrate and gaps between the two surfaces are reduced to isolated pores.
- Interface migration- material begins to diffuse across the boundary of the abutting surfaces, blending this material boundary and creating a bond.

== Benefits ==
- The bonded surface has the same physical and mechanical properties as the base material. Once bonding is complete, the joint may be tested using tensile testing for example.
- The diffusion bonding process is able to produce high quality joints where no discontinuity or porosity exists in the interface.
- Diffusion bonding enables the manufacture of high precision components with complex shapes.
- The diffusion bonding method can be used widely, joining either similar or dissimilar materials, and is also important in processing composite materials.
- The process is not extremely hard to approach and the cost to perform the diffusion bonding is not high.
- The material under diffusion is able to reduce the plastic deformation.

== Applicability ==
Animation of sheet forming process using diffusion welding (see also hydroforming).

Diffusion bonding is primarily used to create intricate forms for the electronics, aerospace, nuclear, and microfluidics industries. It is effective at making parts with microchannels. Since this form of bonding takes a considerable amount of time compared to other joining techniques such as explosion welding, parts are made in small quantities, and often fabrication is mostly automated. However, due to different requirements, the required time could be reduced. In an attempt to reduce fastener count, labor costs, and part count, diffusion bonding, in conjunction with superplastic forming, is also used when creating complex sheet metal forms. Multiple sheets are stacked atop one another and bonded in specific sections. The stack is then placed into a mold and gas pressure expands the sheets to fill the mold. This is often done using titanium or aluminum alloys for parts needed in the aerospace industry.

Typical materials that are welded include titanium, beryllium, and zirconium. In many military aircraft diffusion bonding will help to allow for the conservation of expensive strategic materials and the reduction of manufacturing costs. Some aircraft have over 100 diffusion-bonded parts, including fuselages, outboard and inboard actuator fittings, landing gear trunnions, and nacelle frames.
