= Magnetic pulse welding =

Metal welding process

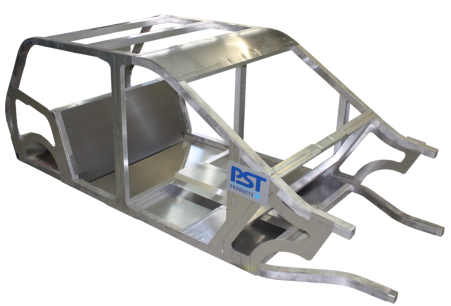
Magnetic pulse welded space frame

Magnetic pulse welding (MPW) is a solid-state welding process that uses magnetic forces to weld two workpieces together. The welding mechanism is most similar to that of explosion welding. Magnetic pulse welding started in the early 1970s, when the automotive industry began to use solid-state welding.

The primary advantage of using magnetic pulse welding is that the formation of brittle intermetallic phases is avoided, allowing the joining of metals which cannot be effectively joined by fusion welding. Additionally, the process is nearly instantaneous and does not require shielding gas or other welding consumables.

== Process ==
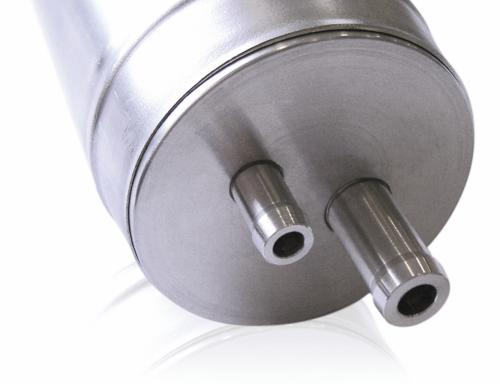
Magnetic pulse welded HVAC pressure vessel

Magnetic pulse welding is based on a very short electromagnetic pulse (<100 μs), which is obtained by a fast discharge of capacitors through low inductance switches into a coil. The pulsed current with a very high amplitude and frequency (500 kA and 15 kHz) produces a high-density magnetic field, which creates an eddy current in one of the work pieces. Repulsive Lorentz forces are created and a high magnetic pressure well beyond the material yield strength causes acceleration of one of the work pieces to velocities of up to 500 m/s (1,100 mph) upon collision.

The flying work piece then impacts its target, though different parts will contact at different times. As the line of contact moves, typically a jet of ejected surface material forms ahead of the contact line. This jet is beneficial as it effectively cleans the surfaces by ejecting some surface material (removing oxides or contaminants).

During magnetic pulse welding a high plastic deformation is developed along with high shear strain and oxide disruption due to the jet and high temperatures near the collision zone. This leads to a solid-state weld due to the microstructure refinement (dislocation cells, slip bands, micro twins and local recrystallization).

== Principles ==
In order to achieve a strong weld, several conditions have to be reached:

- Jetting condition: the collision has to be subsonic compared to the local material's speed of sound to generate a jet.
- High pressure regime: the impact velocity has to be sufficient to obtain a hydrodynamic regime, otherwise the parts will only be crimped or formed.
- No fusion during the collision: If the pressure is too high, the materials can locally melt and re-solidify. This can cause a weak weld.

The main difference between magnetic pulse welding and explosive welding is that the collision angle and the velocity are almost constant during the explosive welding process, while in magnetic pulse welding they continuously vary.

== Numerical simulations of MPW ==
Various numerical investigations were carried out to predict the interface behavior of the MPW and the in-flight behavior of the flyer to determine the collision conditions. Generally, the flyer velocity prior to the impact governs the interfacial phenomena. This is the characteristic parameter that should be known based on the process and adjustable process parameters. Although experimental measurements using laser velocimetry methods provide an accurate assessment of the flyer velocity; one example of such measurement is Photon Doppler velocimetry (PDV); numerical computation offers a better description of the flyer velocity in terms of spatial and temporal distribution.

A multi-physics computation of the MPW process can take into account of the electrical current through the coil and compute the physical behavior for an electromagnetic-mechanical coupled problem. These simulations also allow the thermal effect during the process to be included. A 3D example model used for LS-DYNA simulation is also used, and it also provides some details of the physical interactions of the process, the governing equations, the resolution procedure, and both boundary and initial conditions. The model is used to show the capability of 3D computation to predict the process behavior and particularly, the flyer kinematics and macroscopic deformation.
