= Explosion welding =

Type of welding that makes use of chemical explosives

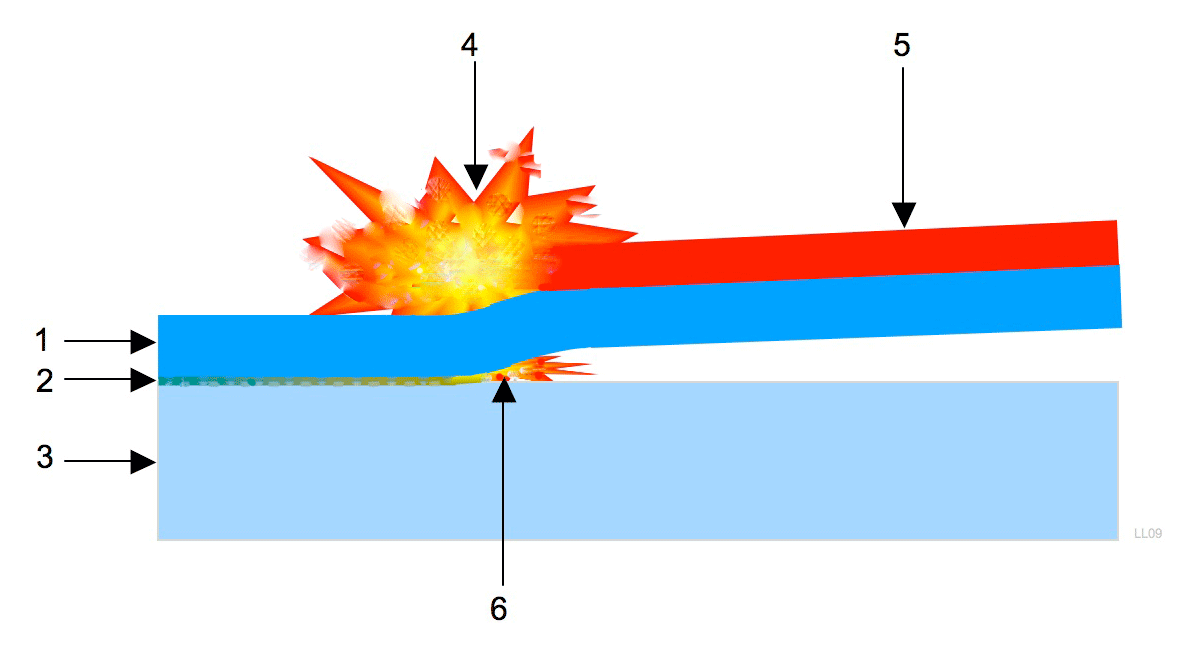
Explosion welding 1 Flyer (cladding). 2 Resolidified zone (needs to be minimised for welding of dissimilar materials). 3 Target (substrate). 4 Explosion. 5 Explosive powder. 6 Plasma jet.

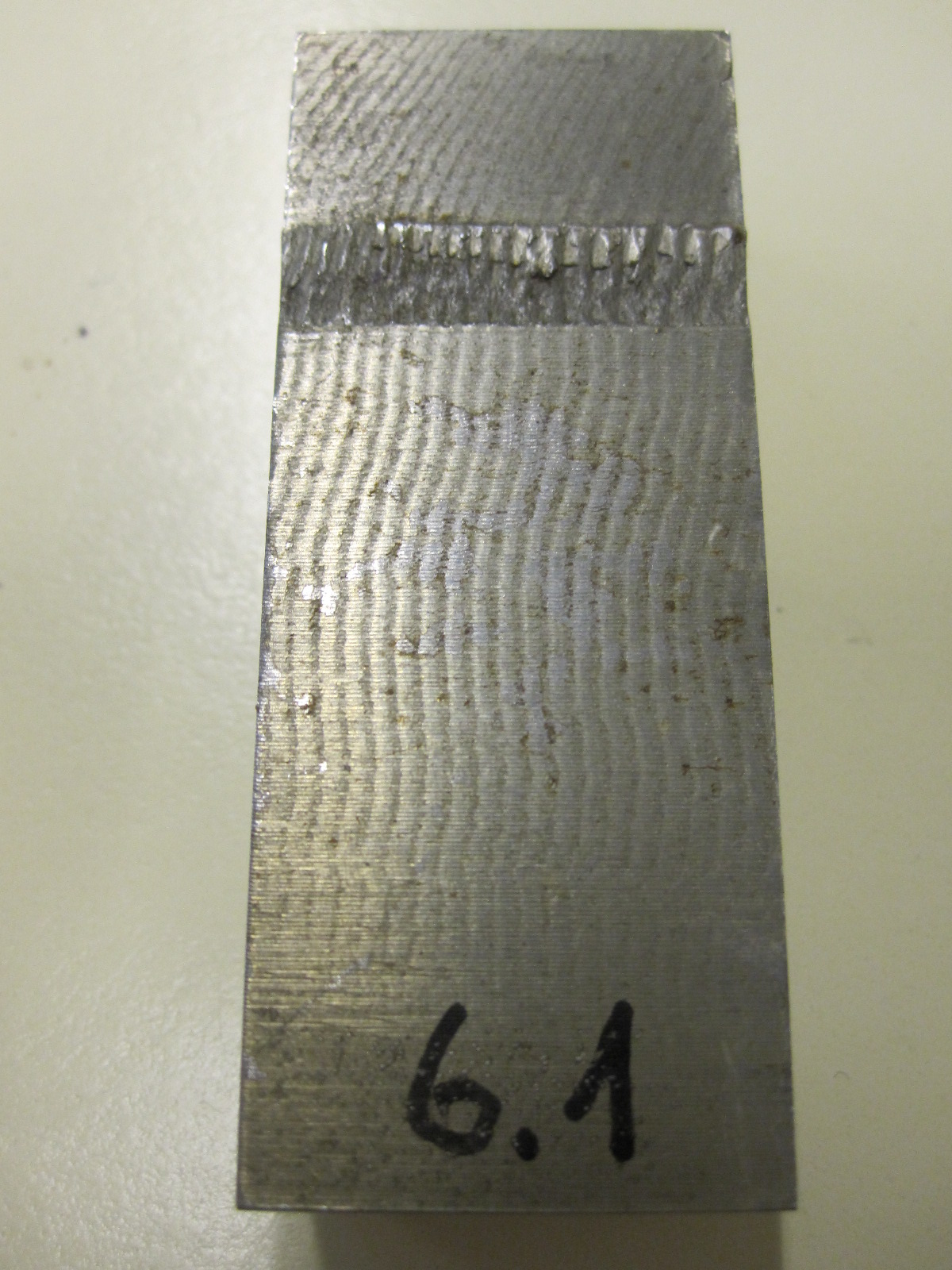
Polished section of an explosion weld with typical wave-structure

Explosion welding (EXW) is a solid state (solid-phase) process where welding is accomplished by accelerating one of the components at extremely high velocity through the use of chemical explosives. This process is often used to clad carbon steel or aluminium plate with a thin layer of a harder or more corrosion-resistant material (e.g., stainless steel, nickel alloy, titanium, or zirconium). Due to the nature of this process, producible geometries are very limited. Typical geometries produced include plates, tubing and tube sheets.

== Development ==
Unlike other forms of welding, such as arc welding (which was developed in the late 19th century), explosion welding was developed relatively recently, in the decades after World War II. Its origins, however, go back to World War I, when it was observed that pieces of shrapnel sticking to armor plating were not only embedding themselves, but were actually being welded to the metal. Since the extreme heat involved in other forms of welding did not play a role, it was concluded that the phenomenon was caused by the explosive forces acting on the shrapnel. These results were later duplicated in laboratory tests and, not long afterwards, the process was patented and put to use.

In 1962, DuPont applied for a patent on the explosion welding process, which was granted on June 23, 1964, under US Patent 3,137,937 and resulted in the use of the Detaclad trademark to describe the process. On July 22, 1996, Dynamic Materials Corporation completed the acquisition of DuPont's Detaclad operations for a purchase price of $5,321,850 (or about $10.67 million today).

The response of inhomogeneous plates undergoing explosive welding was analytically modeled in 2011.

== Advantages and disadvantages ==
Explosion welding can produce a bond between two metals that cannot necessarily be welded by conventional means. The process does not melt either metal, instead plasticizing the surfaces of both metals, causing them to come into intimate contact sufficient to create a weld. This is a similar principle to other non-fusion welding techniques, such as friction welding. Large areas can be bonded extremely quickly and the weld itself is very clean, due to the fact that the surface material of both metals is violently expelled during the reaction.

Explosion welding can join a wide array of compatible and incompatible metals, with more than 260 metal combinations possible. With traditional welding, its components are usually metals that have similar properties. However, with explosion welding, the high initial acceleration of the two components at each other can bypass the properties of metal and join two different metals together. As a result, the new metal has combined properties of the original two metals that can lead to more conductivity, strength, and durability. For example, explosion welding is most commonly used to join materials like stainless steel to copper (Blazynski, 1983). The product is a component that has thermal conductivity and structural stability. Explosion welding offers a solution to the difficulty of joining metals with different properties or melting points.

A disadvantage of this method is that extensive knowledge of explosives is needed before the procedure may be attempted safely. Regulations for the use of high explosives may require special licensing.

== See also ==
- Magnetic pulse welding
