= Fushi =

Fushi may refer to:

- Fushi (Alif Alif Atoll) (Republic of Maldives)
- Fushi (Laamu Atoll) (Republic of Maldives)
- Fushi (Thaa Atoll) (Republic of Maldives)
- Fushi (novel) by novelist Mao Dun (Mao-Tun), about the New Fourth Army Incident
- Fushi Copperweld (傅氏科普威), the name of Copperweld when it was under Chinese ownership
- The historical name (膚施, Fū shī) of the city of Yan'an in Shaanxi, China
- Fushi, Yongding County (抚市镇), town in Fujian, China
- Fushi, Rong'an County (浮石镇), town in Guangxi, China
- Fushi (To Your Eternity), the main character of the manga series To Your Eternity
