= Copperweld =

American wire and cable company based in Tennessee

- Industry: Electrical conductors
- Founded: Rankin, Pennsylvania, United States (August 16, 1915) as "The Copper-Clad Steel Company"
- Headquarters: Fayetteville, Tennessee
- Area served: Worldwide
- Products: Copperweld brand copper clad steel (CCS) wire and cable copper clad aluminum (CCA) wire and cable
- Number of employees: 120 (2020)
- Website: copperweld.com

Copperweld is an American company based in Fayetteville, Tennessee, and maintaining a management office in Brentwood, Tennessee. Its main products are wire and stranded electrical cable made from its Copperweld brand copper-clad steel ("CCS") or copper-clad aluminum ("CCA"). In addition to its American operations, Copperweld maintains a production facility in Telford, England, and a distribution hub in Liège, Belgium.

== History ==
=== Beginnings ===
A group of engineers (S. E. Bramer, Jacob Roth, F. R. S. Kaplan, Simon Loeb and William Smith Sr.) in the Pittsburgh industrial town of Rankin, Pennsylvania first created a permanent metallurgical bond between copper and steel in 1915. This bond originally was made under a molten weld process. Their product, a CCS wire patented under the brand name Copperweld, was soon adopted as an alternative to solid copper wire in many conductor applications, particularly those where copper would be too ductile or would not offer the breaking strength of steel. The original use, however, was for watch springs: the copper cladding prevented corrosion. The company was founded as the Copper-Clad Steel Company, but in 1924, changed its name to the Copperweld Steel Company.

In 1927, the company installed itself in a former axe factory in Glassport, Pennsylvania. Copperweld Steel went public for the first time in 1929, shortly before the onset of the Great Depression, but its shares were eventually withdrawn.

The United States government was the company's major client throughout the Depression and World War II, and its patronage is largely responsible for keeping the company solvent in that time of severe economic downturn. The company was listed on the New York Curb Exchange in 1937, and on the New York Stock Exchange in 1940. It would continue to trade on the NYSE until 1999.

In 1939, Copperweld would open its second factory in Warren, Ohio, manufacturing steel billets.

=== Post-war growth and diversification ===
After the war, the resurgence of the American economy helped Copperweld thrive. The company's management offices relocated from Glassport to downtown Pittsburgh soon after the war. Although there was considerable investment in existing divisions, acquisition became another of the company's major growth paths. In 1951, the company acquired the Flexo Wire Co. of Oswego, New York. The next year, Copperweld entered into the steel tube manufacturing business with the acquisition of Ohio Seamless Tubing Company of Shelby, Ohio. In 1957, the company merged with stainless steel finisher Superior Steel Company, but sold off the division after five years of poor performance.

In conjunction with Battelle Memorial Institute, the company developed a second bimetallic product line, an aluminum-covered steel wire that it branded as Alumoweld® in 1959. The new product was successful, and the company engaged in its first international joint venture in 1966, with the creation of the Japan Alumoweld Company of Numazu, Japan. Copperweld's stake was 45%, with the remainder owned by Japanese wire and cable manufacturer Fujikura Ltd.

In 1972, Copperweld Steel Co. acquired the Chicago-based Regal Tube division of Lear-Siegler.

=== A new name ===
Now truly diversified, the company changed its name in 1973 to Copperweld Corporation. The company expanded into the primary and secondary metallurgical products market, offering a diversified product range that included steel pipe and tube; bimetallic wire, strand and strip; steel bars and plates; solder and skiving, and employed thousands at multiple facilities in the United States, Canada, Japan and Britain. The bimetallic process moved beyond simple copper and steel, and eventually also combined metals and alloys such as aluminum, tin, brass, gold, nickel and silver.

In 1974, the company's third foray into bimetallics was realized when the company opened a CCA wire manufacturing plant in Fayetteville, Tennessee. That division, Copperweld Southern, would go on to become the focus of the company's bimetallic wire operation.

=== Takeover ===
French holding company Imétal S.A. (today known as Imerys), owned by the Rothschild family, acquired controlling interest of Copperweld Corporation in 1975. Imétal's acquisition of Copperweld represented the first hostile takeover of an American company by a foreign entity. Imétal vowed not to interfere with the theretofore successful company's direction.

In 1978, the company expanded its bimetallic wire production to Campinas, Brazil in a joint venture with Erico International Corp. Copperweld would buy the entire operation from its partner just three years later. Also in 1978 the firm announced the layoff of its Glassport, Pennsylvania facility along with 548 full-time jobs, prompting the mayor of Pittsburgh and the head of the RIDC to have a 2-hour meeting with company executives in an attempt to save the facility.

A new division and revenue stream were created in 1980 with the advent of Copperweld Energy, which bought stakes in Houston-based Guardian Oil Company. The ostensible purpose of Copperweld's involvement in the energy business was to drill for natural gas on the grounds of (or near) its operations in Ohio and Pennsylvania, to ensure a steady supply for its factories. That same year, the company acquired American Seamless Tubing of Baltimore, Maryland.

In 1984, the U.S. Supreme Court ruled in favor of Copperweld in a landmark antitrust case, Copperweld Corp. v. Independence Tube Corp., that a parent company is incapable of conspiracy with a wholly owned subsidiary.

The severe steel crisis of the late 1970s and early 1980s hit Copperweld hard. The venerable Glassport facility would close entirely in 1983. In 1986, the Oswego fine wire division was shut down. Both operations were relocated to Copperweld Southern in Fayetteville, largely due to cheaper labor costs in the South.

=== Two Copperwelds ===
In a bold move to shed the company of its crippled steel manufacturing operations and concentrate on fabricated steel products, Imétal spun off Copperweld's Warren, Ohio operation into a separate publicly traded company in 1986. That company, CSC Industries, would continue to operate as the Copperweld Steel Company, causing confusion. For some time, two "Copperwelds" existed.

However, Imétal's gamble paid off. Copperweld Corporation returned to profitability just one year after the spin-off of CSC Industries, which, by contrast, was doomed. The newly formed company never turned a profit in its entire history, and went bankrupt in 1993. The assets of CSC Industries were acquired in a bidding war by Ohio-based Hamlin Holdings in 1995, and they discontinued use of the Copperweld name.

The late 1980s saw a much healthier Copperweld Corporation divest of its operations in Brazil and sell its tubing operation in Baltimore. Expansion was again on the horizon, with the 1988 announcement of a $90 million upgrade to its plant in Shelby, Ohio, and the construction of another tube plant in Birmingham, Alabama. The company also bought National Standard Company's Copperply division, giving it control of a competing brand in bimetallic wire.

In 1989, Copperweld and Fujikura announce a second joint venture together, the United States Alumoweld Company, to be located in Duncan, South Carolina. In 1992, the Copperweld Corporation divested itself of the Alumoweld® business altogether, selling its shares and the rights to the brand to Fujikura.

Further growth by acquisition continued in the company's tube sector in the 1990s as it acquired Piqua, Ohio-based Miami Industries in 1993 and two Canadian steel tube companies, Standard Tube Canada and Sonco Steel Tube in 1997. That same year, the Shelby plant was the subject of another important expansion. In 1998, the company announced the building of a stainless steel tube plant in Elizabethtown, Kentucky.

The bimetallic wire division also prospered, with a drastic increase in demand of bimetallic wires for the cellular telephony boom. In 1995, the company bought Metallon Engineered Materials Corporation of Pawtucket, Rhode Island in 1995. There was a major expansion of the Fayetteville facility in 1997, and it purchased Sayton Fine Wires of Telford, England in 1998.

=== LTV ===
In 1999, Cleveland, Ohio-based LTV Steel acquired Copperweld Corporation from Imétal for $650 million, and the subsidiary became known as LTV Copperweld. At that time, the company was the largest producer of structural steel tubing in North America with 23 plants and employing 3,500 people. But LTV was drowning in debt, and at the end of 2000, LTV, along with 48 subsidiaries, including Copperweld, filed voluntary petitions for relief under Chapter 11 of the U.S. Bankruptcy Code.

Under the order of conservators, LTV's various subsidiaries were sold off. But because the LTV Copperweld division maintained profitable operations throughout LTV's bankruptcy proceeding, it was able to secure separate debtor-in-possession financing through GE Commercial Finance. In late 2003, LTV Copperweld emerged from bankruptcy.

=== Dofasco ===
Dofasco (today a division of Arcelor Mittal) acquired most of the LTV Copperweld assets, including 50% of the bimetallic wire division, which would in turn be sold to a North Carolina businessman David S. Jones for $14.2 million in 2006 and operated as Copperweld Bimetallics LLC. It was the only division of the previous conglomerate to continue to operate under the Copperweld name, and kept the established brand as a registered trademark for its copper-clad steel conductors.

=== Fushi ===
In August 2007, however, the owner sold the company for US$22.5 million to Fushi International, founded by Li Fu in 2001. The acquisition is significant because it represents the first major investment in the state of Tennessee for a mainland Chinese company. By acquiring Copperweld, it not only opened up a worldwide distribution channel, it also gained product diversification by the presence of CCS wire in its new subsidiary's lineup. Three months later, Fushi International was listed on the Nasdaq, and changed its name to Fushi Copperweld, capilizing on the established brand name in the west.

A group of investors headed by Chairman Fu Li delisted from the Nasdaq on December 27, 2012, returning the company to private ownership gain.

=== Kinderhook ===
In October 2019, Kinderhook Industries LLC announced its acquisition of Copperweld, citing the company's proprietary manufacturing and differentiated products that provide an array of compelling growth avenues to pursue, particularly in the automotive. Kinderhook is a private investment firm that manages over $3.1 billion of committed capital.

== Locations and subsidiaries ==
- Copperweld Bimetallics LLC in Fayetteville, Tennessee (opened 1975, acquired 2007)
- Copperweld Bimetallics UK Ltd. in Telford, England (formerly Sayton Fine Wire, opened 1998, acquired 2007)
- Copperweld Bimetallics Europe SPRL in Liège, Belgium (formed 2011)

== Products ==
Copperweld manufactures bimetallic wire and electrical cable. The metallic combinations are engineered to provide the benefits of two disparate materials. CCS, or copper-clad steel wire, provides the strength of steel with the conductivity of copper. In 1963, the original molten-weld process for Copperweld® CCS wire was abandoned in favor of a pressure-rolling process, which is still used today. In the case of CCA, or copper-clad aluminum, the key benefit over solid copper is lighter weight and flexibility.

In late 2013, Copperweld Bimetallics LLC, the company's American subsidiary, purchased most of the assets of its biggest American competitor, the Bimetals division of CommScope, relocating their equipment from Statesville, North Carolina to Copperweld's plant in Fayetteville, Tennessee.
