= 2020–2021 Alabama aluminum plant strike =

Labor dispute in Alabama, United States

2020 Alabama aluminum plant strike
- Date: December 15, 2020 – January 12, 2021 (28 days)
- Location: Muscle Shoals, Alabama

Parties
Constellium	United Steelworkers Local 200

The 2020 Alabama aluminum plant strike is a labor strike that occurred in Muscle Shoals, Alabama, United States from December 2020 to January 2021. The strike involved approximately 400 members of the United Steelworkers Local 200, over alleged unfair labor practices by Constellium, a multinational producer of aluminum products who operate a manufacturing plant.

== Background ==
In January 2015, the company Wise Metals was acquired by French-based multinational aluminum products manufacturer Constellium. As part of the acquisition, Constellium gained ownership of an aluminum sheet metal manufacturing plant in Muscle Shoals, Alabama. The plant primarily produces sheet metal for use in drink cans and has contracts with several major companies, including Budweiser. In 2020, the plant was one of 25 operated by Constellium across China, Europe, and North America, with 13,000 employees worldwide. A previous labor strike against Constellium involved 700 workers and took place at an aluminum plant in Ravenswood, West Virginia in 2012. In 2020, the Muscle Shoals plant employed 1,200 workers, making the plant the city's largest employer. Many of the workers are union members of United Steelworkers (USW) Local 200. On November 1, 2020, after months of failed labor contract negotiations between the union and Constellium, the contract expired. According to the union's district director, safety and seniority were the primary points of dispute, with the director alleging that the contract proposed by Constellium would have given management "unchecked authority" over scheduling.

== Course of the strike ==
On December 15, 2020, Constellium was notified by USW that local members had voted to reject the most recent collective bargaining proposal, and on midnight, the local members officially went on strike. Strikers are alleging unfair labor practices by Constellium and have picketed the plant. USW President Tom Conway stated that the strike would continue until Constellium "comes to their senses" and, speaking about concessions requested by the company, said "there's no need for what they're asking for." The strike is occurring during the COVID-19 pandemic. On December 16, strikers began picketing in the parking lot outside of the plant.

On January 1, 2021, a mediator held discussions between union and company representatives. On January 12, union members ended the strike and returned to work following the ratification of a five-year contract with the company.

== See also ==
- COVID-19 pandemic in Alabama
- Strikes during the COVID-19 pandemic
