= Cladding (metalworking) =

Bonding of metals through extrusion

Cladding is the bonding together of dissimilar metals. It is different from fusion welding or gluing as a method to fasten the metals together. Cladding is often achieved by extruding two metals through a die as well as pressing or rolling sheets together under high pressure.

The United States Mint uses cladding to manufacture coins from different metals. This allows a cheaper metal to be used as a filler. For example, dimes and quarters struck since 1965 have cores made from pure copper, with a clad layer consisting of 75% copper and 25% nickel added during production. Half dollars struck from 1965 to 1969 for circulation and in 1970 for collectors also incorporated cladding, albeit in the case of those coins, the core was a mixture of 20.9% silver and 79.1% copper, and its clad layer was 80% silver and 20% copper. Half dollars struck since 1971 are produced identically to the dimes and quarters.

Laser cladding is an additive manufacturing approach for metal coatings or precise piece restorations by using high power multi-mode optical fiber laser.

== Roll bonding ==
In roll bonding, two or more layers of different metals are thoroughly cleaned and passed through a pair of rollers under sufficient pressure to bond the layers. The pressure is high enough to deform the metals and reduce the combined thickness of the clad material. Heat may be applied, especially when metals are not ductile enough. As an example of application, bonding of the sheets can be controlled by painting a pattern on one sheet; only the bare metal surfaces bond, and the un-bonded portion can be inflated if the sheet is heated and the coating vaporizes. This is used to make heat exchangers for refrigeration equipment.

== Explosive welding ==
In explosive welding, the pressure to bond the two layers is provided by detonation of a sheet of chemical explosive. No heat-affected zone is produced in the bond between metals. The explosion propagates across the sheet, which tends to expel impurities and oxides from between the sheets. Pieces up to 4 x 16 metres can be manufactured. The process is useful for cladding metal sheets with a corrosion-resistant layer.

== Laser cladding ==
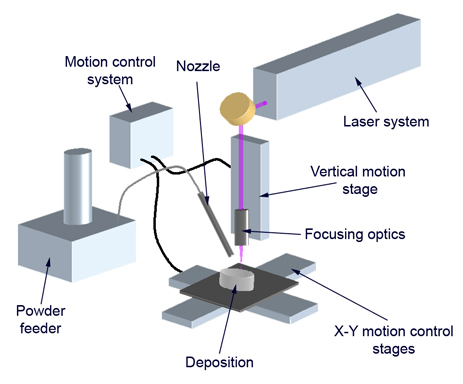
A schematic of the equipment

Laser cladding is a method of depositing material by which a powdered or wire feedstock material is melted and consolidated by use of a laser in order to coat part of a substrate or fabricate a near-net shape part (additive manufacturing technology).

It is often used to improve mechanical properties or increase corrosion resistance, repair worn out parts, and fabricate metal matrix composites. Surface material may be laser cladded directly onto a highly stressed component, i.e. to make a self-lubricating surface. However, such a modification requires further industrialization of the cladding process to adapt it for efficient mass production. Further research on the detailed effects from surface topography, material composition of the laser cladded material and the composition of the additive package in the lubricants on the tribological properties and performance are preferably studied with tribometric testing.

=== Process ===
A laser is used to melt metallic powder dropped on a substrate to be coated. The melted metal forms a pool on the substrate; moving the substrate allows the melt pool to solidify in a track of solid metal. Some processes involve moving the laser and powder nozzle assembly over a stationary substrate to produce solidified tracks. The motion of the substrate is guided by a CAM system which interpolates solid objects into a set of tracks, thus producing the desired part at the end of the trajectory.

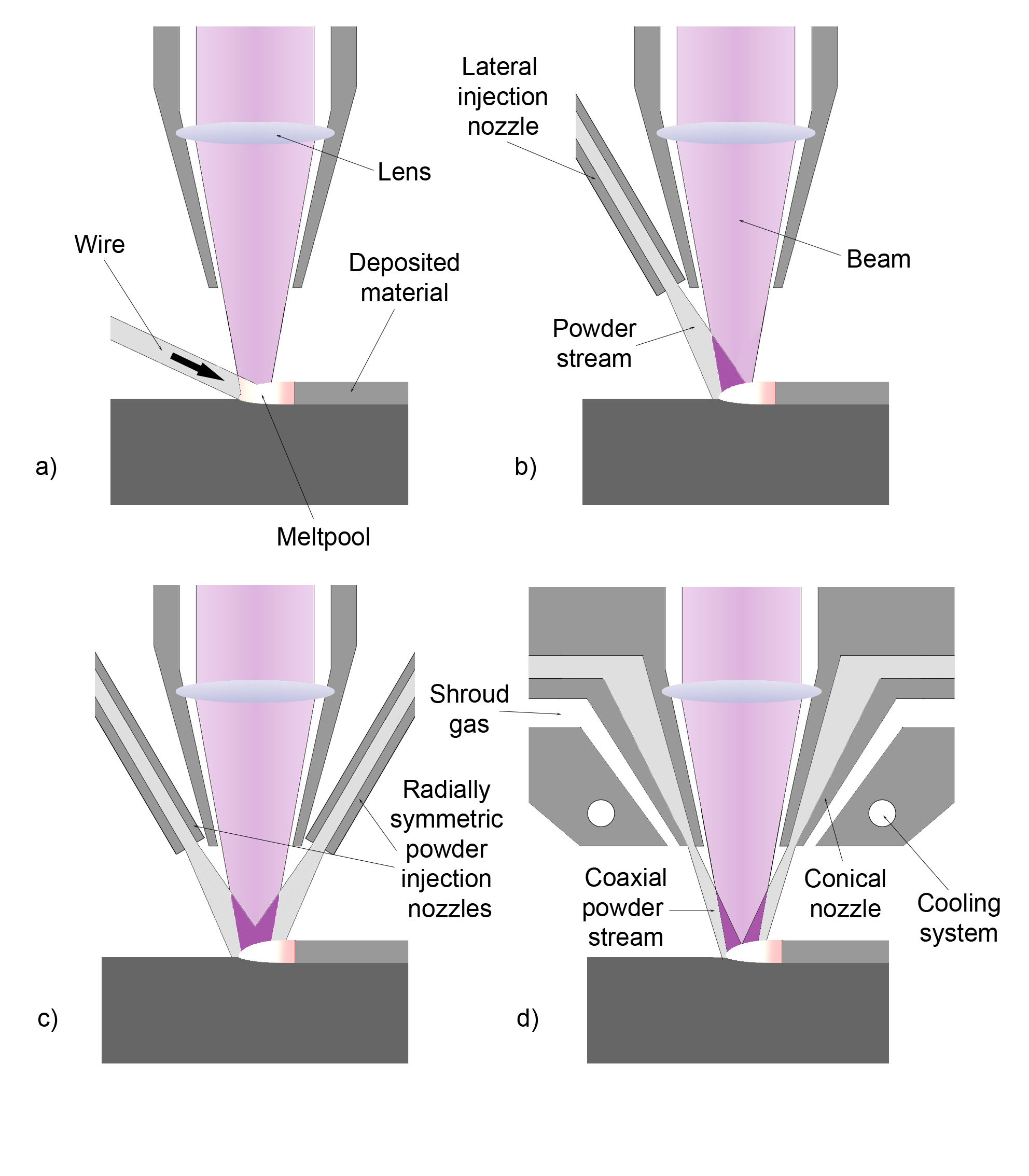
The different feeding systems available

Automatic laser cladding machines are the subject of ongoing research and development. Many of the process parameters must be manually set, such as laser power, laser focal point, substrate velocity, powder injection rate, etc., and thus require the attention of a specialized technician to ensure proper results. By use of sensors to monitor the deposited track height and width, metallurgical properties, and temperature, constant observation from a technician is no longer required to produce a final product. Further research has been directed to forward processing where system parameters are developed around specific metallurgical properties for user defined applications (such as microstructure, internal stresses, dilution zone gradients, and clad contact angle).

=== Advantages ===
- Best technique for coating any shape => increase lifetime of wearing parts.
- Particular dispositions for repairing parts (ideal if the mould of the part no longer exist or too much time is needed for a new fabrication).
- Most suitable technique for graded material application.
- Well adapted for near-net-shape manufacturing.
- Low dilution between track and substrate (unlike other welding processes and strong metallurgical bond.
- Low deformation of the substrate and small heat affected zone (HAZ).
- High cooling rate => fine microstructure.
- A lot of material flexibility (metal, ceramic, even polymer).
- Built part is free of crack and porosity.
- Compact technology.

== See also ==
- Additive manufacturing
- All-Clad
- Copper-clad aluminum wire
- Copper-clad steel
- Goldbeating
