= Aluminium–lithium alloys =

Alloy of aluminium and lithium

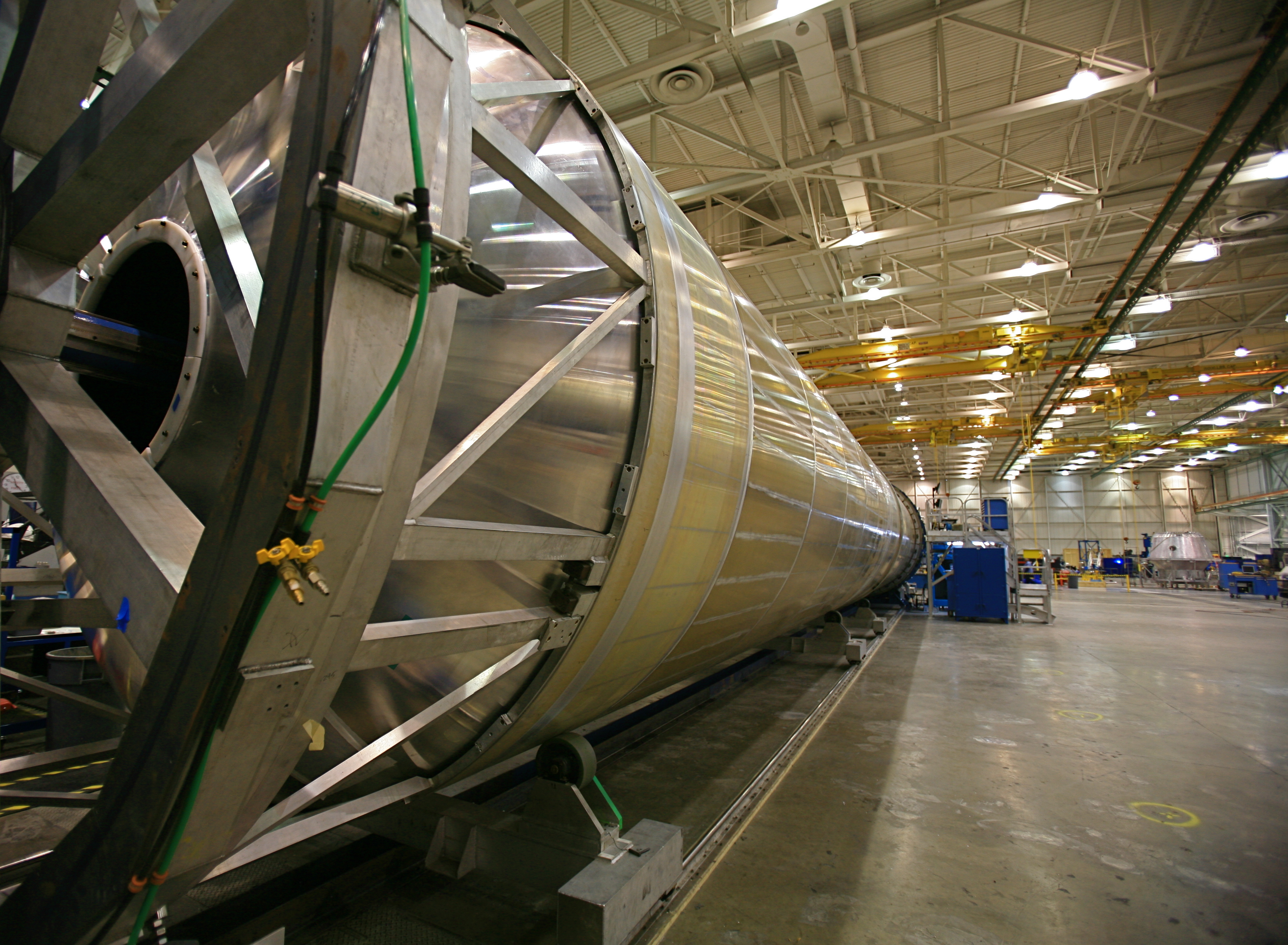
The SpaceX Falcon 9 booster is made of aluminum-lithium alloy.

Aluminium–lithium alloys (American, Canadian, and Philippines English: aluminum–lithium alloys) (Al–Li alloys) are a set of alloys of aluminium and lithium, often also including copper and zirconium. Since lithium is the least dense elemental metal, these alloys are significantly less dense than aluminium. Commercial Al–Li alloys contain up to 2.45% lithium by mass.

== Crystal structure ==
Alloying with lithium reduces structural mass by three effects:

Displacement
A lithium atom is lighter than an aluminium atom; each lithium atom then displaces one aluminium atom from the crystal lattice while maintaining the lattice structure. Every 1% by mass of lithium added to aluminium reduces the density of the resulting alloy by 3% and increases the stiffness by 5%. This effect works up to the solubility limit of lithium in aluminium, which is 4.2%.
Strain hardening
Introducing another type of atom into the crystal strains the lattice, which helps block dislocations. The resulting material is thus stronger, which allows less of it to be used.
Precipitation hardening
When properly aged, lithium forms a metastable Al_{3}Li phase (δ') with a coherent crystal structure. These precipitates strengthen the metal by impeding dislocation motion during deformation. The precipitates are not stable, however, and care must be taken to prevent overaging with the formation of the stable AlLi (β) phase. This also produces precipitate free zones (PFZs) typically at grain boundaries and can reduce the corrosion resistance of the alloy.

The crystal structure for Al_{3}Li and Al–Li, while based on the FCC crystal system, are very different. Al_{3}Li shows almost the same-size lattice structure as pure aluminium, except that lithium atoms are present in the corners of the unit cell. The Al_{3}Li structure is known as the AuCu_{3}, L1_{2}, or Pm3̅m and has a lattice parameter of 4.01 Å. The Al–Li structure is known as the NaTl, B32, or Fd3̅m structure, which is made of both lithium and aluminium assuming diamond structures and has a lattice parameter of 6.37 Å. The interatomic spacing for Al–Li (3.19 Å) is smaller than either pure lithium or aluminium.

== Usage ==
Al–Li alloys are primarily of interest to the aerospace industry for their weight advantage. On narrow-body airliners, Arconic (formerly Alcoa) claims up to 10% weight reduction compared to composites, leading to up to 20% better fuel efficiency, at a lower cost than titanium or composites. Aluminium–lithium alloys were first used in the wings and horizontal stabilizer of the North American A-5 Vigilante military aircraft. Other Al–Li alloys have been employed in the lower wing skins of the Airbus A380, the inner wing structure of the Airbus A350, the fuselage of the Airbus A220 (where the alloys make up 24% of the fuselage), the cargo floor of the Boeing 777X, and the fan blades of the Pratt & Whitney PurePower geared turbofan aircraft engine. They are also used in the fuel and oxidizer tanks in the SpaceX Falcon 9 launch vehicle, Formula One brake calipers, and the AgustaWestland EH101 helicopter.

The third and final version of the US Space Shuttle's external tank was principally made of Al–Li 2195 alloy. In addition, Al–Li alloys are also used in the Centaur Forward Adapter in the Atlas V rocket, in the Orion Spacecraft, and were to be used in the planned Ares I and Ares V rockets (part of the cancelled Constellation program).

Al–Li alloys are generally joined by friction stir welding. Some Al–Li alloys, such as Weldalite 049, can be welded conventionally; however, this property comes at the price of density; Weldalite 049 has about the same density as 2024 aluminium and 5% higher elastic modulus. Al–Li is also produced in rolls as wide as 220 inches (18 feet; 5.6 metres), which can reduce the number of joins.

Although aluminium–lithium alloys are generally superior to aluminium–copper or aluminium–zinc alloys in ultimate strength-to-weight ratio, their poor fatigue strength under compression remains a problem, which is only partially solved as of 2016. Also, high costs (around 3 times or more than for conventional aluminium alloys), poor corrosion resistance, and strong anisotropy of mechanical properties of rolled aluminium–lithium products has resulted in a paucity of applications.

Al-Li alloy powder is used in the production of lightweight sporting goods, including bicycles, tennis rackets, golf clubs, and baseball bats. Its high strength combined with reduced weight significantly enhances performance, speed, and maneuverability. It is also used in the automobile industry as body panels, chassis parts, and suspension components.

== List of aluminium–lithium alloys ==
Aside from its formal four-digit designation derived from its element composition, an aluminium–lithium alloy is also associated with particular generations, based primarily on when it was first produced, but secondarily on its lithium content. The first generation lasted from the initial background research in the early 20th century to their first aircraft application in the middle 20th century. Consisting of alloys that were meant to replace the popular 2024 and 7075 alloys directly, the second generation of Al–Li had high lithium content of at least 2%; this characteristic produced a large reduction in density but resulted in some negative effects, particularly in fracture toughness. The third generation is the current generation of Al–Li product that is available, and it has gained wide acceptance by aircraft manufacturers, unlike the previous two generations. This generation has reduced lithium content to 0.75–1.8% to mitigate those negative characteristics while retaining some of the density reduction; third-generation Al–Li densities range from 2.63 to 2.72 grams per cubic centimetre (0.095 to 0.098 pounds per cubic inch).

=== First-generation alloys (1920s–1960s) ===
First-generation Al–Li alloys
Alloy name/number	Applications
1230 (VAD23)	Tu-144
1420	MiG-29 fuselages, fuel tanks, and cockpits; Su-27; Tu-156, Tu-204, and Tu-334; Yak-36, and Yak-38 fuselages
1421	
2020	A-5 Vigilante wings and horizontal stabilizers

=== Second-generation alloys (1970s–1980s) ===
Second-generation Al–Li alloys
Alloy name/number	Applications
1430	
1440	
1441	Be-103 and Be-200
1450	An-124 and An-225
1460	McDonnell Douglas reusable launch vehicle (DC-X); Tu-156
2090 (intended to replace 7075)	Airbus A330 and Airbus A340 leading edges; C-17 Globemaster; Atlas Centaur payload adapter
2091 (CP 274) (intended to replace 2024)	Fokker 28 and Fokker 100 access doors in the fuselage lower fairing
8090 (CP 271) (intended to replace 2024)	EH-101 airframe; Airbus A330 and Airbus A340 leading edges; Titan IV payload adapter

=== Third-generation alloys (1990s–2010s) ===
Third-generation Al–Li alloys
Alloy name/number	Applications
2050 (AirWare I-Gauge)	Ares I crew launch vehicle – upper stage; A350 wing ribs; A380 lower wing reinforcement
2055	
2060 (C14U)	
2065	
2076	
2096	
2098	
2099 (C460)	A380 stringers, extruded crossbeams, longitudinal beams, and seat rails; Boeing 787
2195	Ares I crew launch vehicle – upper stage; Last revision of the Space Shuttle Super Lightweight External Tank Falcon 9 propellant tanks
2196	A380 extruded crossbeams, longitudinal beams, and seat rails
2198 (AirWare I-Form)	Fuselage skin of the A350 and A220; Falcon 9 second-stage rocket
2199 (C47A)	
2296	
2297	F-16 bulkheads
2397	F-16 bulkheads; Space Shuttle Super Lightweight External Tank intertank thrust panels
Al–Li TP–1	
C99N	

=== Other alloys ===
- 1424 aluminium alloy
- 1429 aluminium alloy
- 1441K aluminium alloy
- 1445 aluminium alloy
- V-1461 aluminium alloy
- V-1464 aluminium alloy
- V-1469 aluminium alloy
- V-1470 aluminium alloy
- 2094 aluminium alloy
- 2095 aluminium alloy (Weldalite 049)
- 2097 aluminium alloy
- 2197 aluminium alloy
- 8025 aluminium alloy
- 8091 aluminium alloy
- 8093 aluminium alloy
- CP 276

== Production sites ==
Key world producers of aluminium–lithium alloy products are Arconic, Constellium, and Kamensk-Uralsky Metallurgical Works.

- Arconic Technical Center (Upper Burrell, Pennsylvania, USA)
- Arconic Lafayette (Indiana, USA); annual capacity of 20,000 metric tons (22,000 short tons; 20,000,000 kg; 44,000,000 lb) of aluminium–lithium and capable of casting round and rectangular ingot for rolled, extruded and forged applications
- Arconic Kitts Green (United Kingdom)
- Rio Tinto Alcan Dubuc Plant (Canada); capacity 30,000 t (33,000 short tons; 30,000,000 kg; 66,000,000 lb)
- Constellium Issoire (Puy-de-Dôme), France; annual capacity of 14,000 t (15,000 short tons; 14,000,000 kg; 31,000,000 lb)
- Kamensk-Uralsky Metallurgical Works (KUMZ)
- Aleris (Koblenz, Germany)
- FMC Corporation - FMC spun off its lithium division into Livent, which has now (2024) merged to form Arcadium (https://arcadiumlithium.com/)
- Southwest Aluminium (PRC)

== See also ==
- Aluminium alloy
- Magnesium–lithium alloys
- GLARE
- Carbon fiber reinforced plastic (CFRP)

== Bibliography ==
- Grushko, Olga; Ovsyannikov, Boris; Ovchinnokov, Viktor (2016). Eskin, D. G. (ed.). Aluminum-Lithium Alloys: Process Metallurgy, Physical Metallurgy, and Welding. Advances in metallic alloys. Vol. 8. CRC Press/Taylor & Francis Group. doi:10.1201/9781315369525. ISBN 9781498737173. OCLC 943678703.
- Eswara Prasad, N.; Gokhale, Amol A.; Wanhill, R. J. H., eds. (2014). Aluminum-Lithium Alloys: Processing, Properties, and Applications. Elsevier/Butteworth-Heinemann (published 20 September 2013). doi:10.1016/C2012-0-00394-8. ISBN 978-0-12-401698-9. OCLC 871759610.
