= Kamensk-Uralsky Metallurgical Works =

- Trade name: KUMZ
- Company type: Joint-stock company
- Industry: Aluminum
- Founded: 1944
- Headquarters: Kamensk-Uralsky, Russia
- Area served: Worldwide
- Key people: Alexander Semenikhin (Managing Director)
- Products: aluminum alloy rolled, extruded, forged products
- Revenue: ▲US$ 422 million (2014)
- Operating income: ▲US$ 57 million (2014)
- Net income: -US$ 39 million (2014)
- Number of employees: 3,980 (2014)
- Website: www.kumz.ru/eng

Kamensk-Uralsky Metallurgical Works J.S.Co. (KUMZ) is one of the town-forming enterprises of Kamensk-Uralsky, Sverdlovsk Oblast, Russia. KUMZ was founded especially for supplying of aerospace industry with semi-finished products in aluminium and magnesium alloys. Currently, the plant produces aluminium alloy billets, forged and rolled plates, roll bond heat exchangers, extruded rods, bars, tubes, drill pipes, profiles, die-forgings.

== History ==
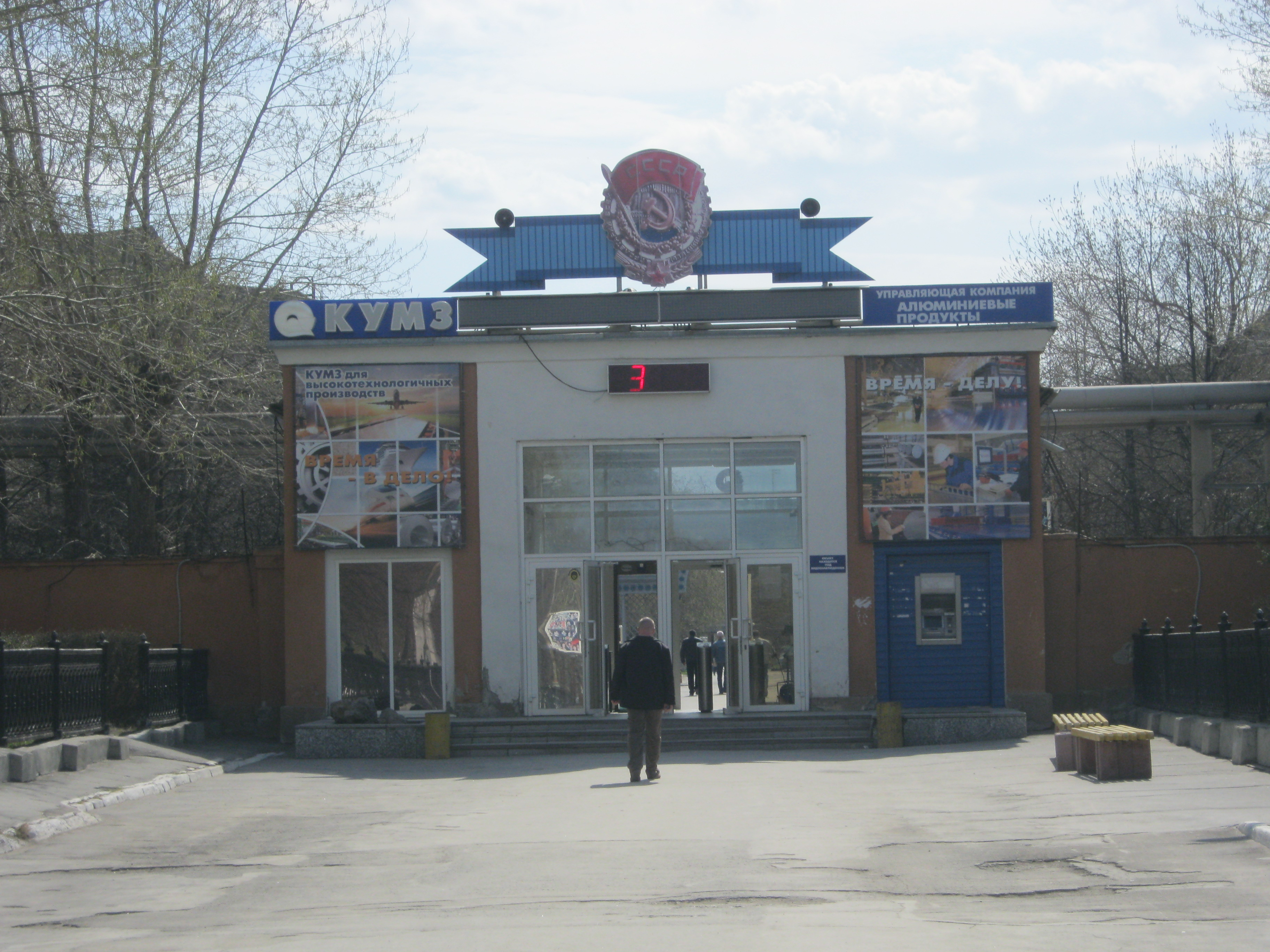
Central pass-through of KUMZ

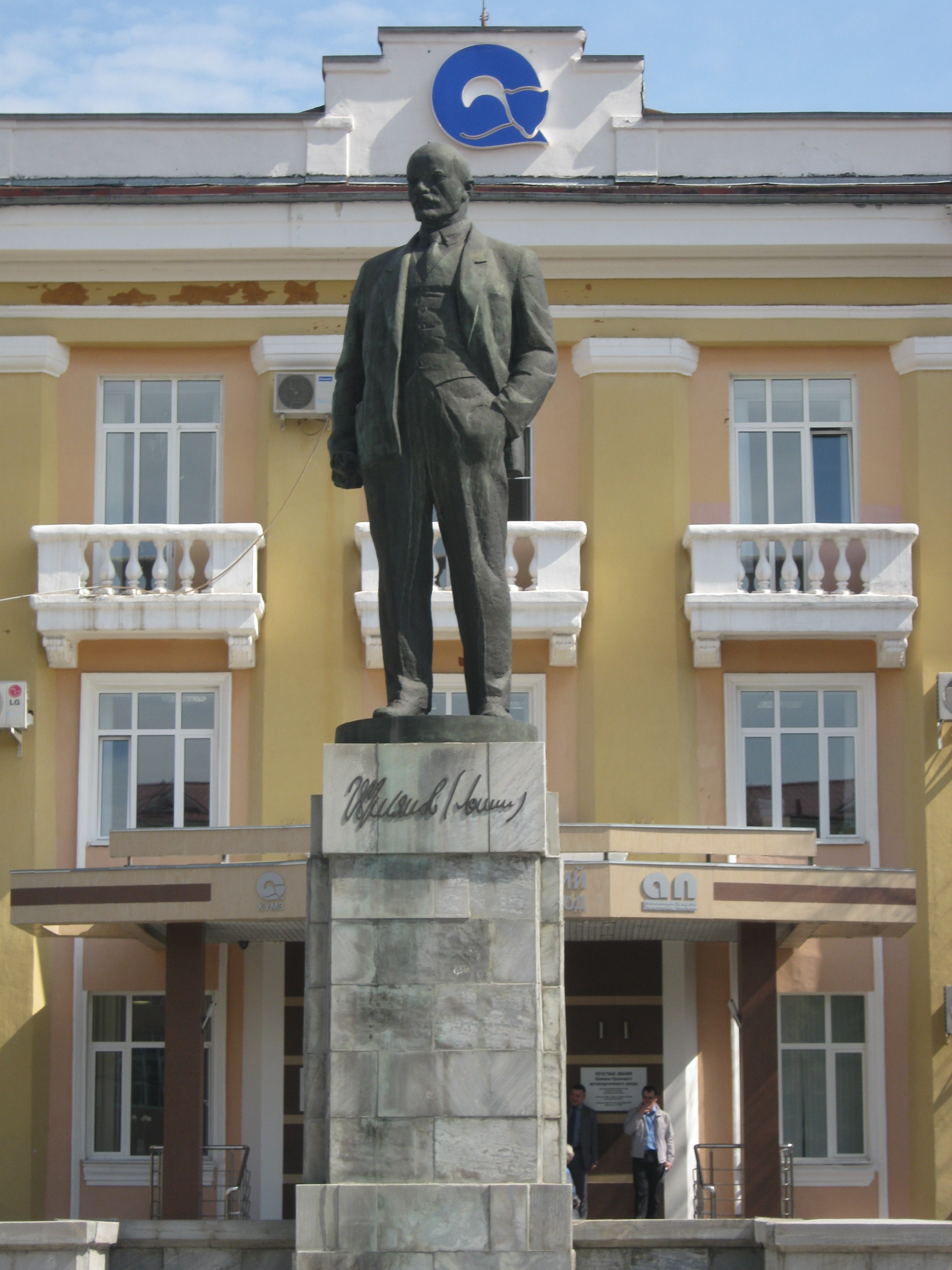
Main office building

The History of KUMZ starts with Decision of Government of the Soviet Union No. 513-99C dated June 3 of year 1939 regarding building of the Works No. 268 for magnesium alloy products. The construction started in May 1940. During World War II the plant has received casting and rolling production equipment of Stupino metallurgical works evacuated from Moscow region. First aluminium alloy slabs were produced in February 1942.

First forged and extruded products were produced in the autumn of 1943. On May 5, 1944 in Pravda newspaper the report about the launch of the plant was published. This date is considered as birthday of the KUMZ. In 1945 new equipment for rolling production was installed. In 1949 KUMZ began the production of aluminium cookware.

In the 1950s the plant increased its production capacity and products range. New workshops were built: forging-extrusion (1951), casting (1958), extrusion (1959). In 1958 KUMZ has made first export delivery which included 2952 metric tons of aluminium alloy rolled products. In the same year for the first time magnesium rolled products were produced.

While initial production of aluminium alloy light weight drill pipes started at KUMZ in the 1950s. In 1972 KUMZ has built a new specially meant workshop.

In March 1966 the first mechanized line for roll bond heat exchangers production was launched at the plant. From that moment KUMZ supports high quality household refrigerators production.

On 8 July 1978 the Supreme Soviet of the Soviet Union awarded to the plant the Order of the Red Banner of Labour for successful development of production and realization of new technologies.

On November 30 of 1992 the plant was reorganized in Joint stock company.

In December 2007 green-field project for heat treatment of plates was launched.

In December 2011 KUMZ has entered in contracts for construction of new rolling mill complex comprising cold rolling mill, hot rolling mill and heat treatment of sheets. The total investments are estimated as 550 million euro.

In May 2012 unique vertical 300 MN forging press was launched after modernization.

== Space Programmes ==
KUMZ takes part in all Russian (Vostok spacecraft, Voskhod spacecraft, Salyut program, Mir, Proton) and International space programs (International Space Station, Sea Launch).

== Production ==
KUMZ main facilities are

- Casting shop
- Extruded tube production shop
- Extrusion shop
- Tool shop
- Forging shop
- Heat exchanger production shop
- Plate treatment shop
- Rolling-mill shop
- Research and development center

=== Casting production ===
The raw material for the shop are pure aluminium purchased from smelters, alloying components and aluminium scrap. KUMZ has a number of furnaces: electric, gas, coreless type induction, electric vacuum holding; and equipment for cutting and scalping. This allows KUMZ to supply its own workshops with high quality wrought aluminium alloy billets, ingots, slabs produced in situ. About 70 aluminium alloys per Russian standards, more than 20 per international standards EN, DIN, ASTM and own Al-Li alloys are mastered.

=== Rolling production ===
KUMZ has one hot-rolling mill and two cold-rolling mills “Quarto”. Hot-rolling mill was recently modernized in several steps.

The plant is one among few world producers of aluminium-lithium alloy sheets and plates.

Beside the flat surface products tread plates and sheets are produced with diamond pattern by means of special rollers. Such product is used for floors of bus, trucks, rail cars, drill towers.

In 2012 KUMZ installed water jet cutter. It allows pattern cutting of rectangular plates to blanks with desired complex shape.

KUMZ Rolling production serves needs of aerospace industry. Specially treated aluminium plates and sheets are used by Boeing and Bombardier companies in their production of airplanes.

The plant has a production line for aluminium roll bond heat exchangers which are used in household refrigerators and flat plate solar thermal collectors.

=== Extrusion production ===
KUMZ has 39 horizontal hydraulic extrusion presses with power from 500 to 12000 tons. They are situated in four buildings. With help of tools shop KUMZ produces more than 20000 kinds of aluminium profiles, 550 different sizes of bars and rods, 850 kinds of tubes.

=== Forging production ===
Forging production of KUMZ serves the needs of leading Russian design bureaus for passenger aircraft Tupolev, Ilyushin, Sukhoi, Yakovlev, Antonov.

Equipment includes hydraulic vertical die-forging presses from 1250 to 30000 ton-force, hydraulic forging press with capacity of 6000 ton-force, radial ring forging press. 1500 items of die-forged products, 1200 items of forged products and 1600 types of rolled rings from 0.1 kg to 3000 kg are already available.

=== Special production ===
KUMZ produces closed-cell aluminium foam plates which are used as energy and sound absorbing material for automobile industry, building and interior design, aerospace, shipbuilding, railroad transport.

== On-site Laboratory ==
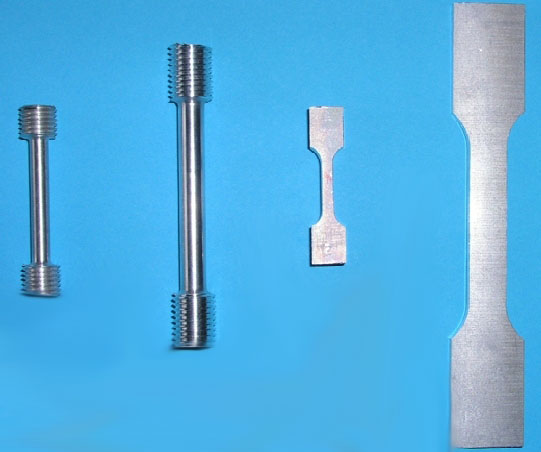
Tensile specimen-round and flat

KUMZ has its own laboratory on-site which can perform different testing of aluminium alloy semifinished products in order to evaluate strength, ductility, chemical composition, uniformity of material:

- Spectral analysis
- Measuring content of the gas in metal
- Tensile testing
- Bending testing
- Hardness testing
- Macrostructure, microstructure control
- Fracture toughness testing
- Electroconductivity measurement
- Ultrasonic testing

== World export ==
Nowadays main part of products produced by KUMZ is meant for export. Aluminium semi-fabricated products are delivered to 46 countries of the World – in Europe, North and South Americas, Asia, Africa, Oceania.

According to requirements of leading consumers of aluminium semis KUMZ received following certificates: ISO 9001:2000 and AS9100 (by SGS from 2006 till 2009, by TÜV from 2009), ISO 14001, OSHAS18001, Lloyd’s Register, Interstate Aviation Committee, Det Norske Veritas, Nadcap (NDT, Heat treating), IRIS (International Railway Industry Standard).

KUMZ products for export ex Russia are exclusively marketed by:

- A.S. Mill Products GmbH (Switzerland)
- A.S. Mill Products Inc (United States)
- A.S. Mill Products HK (Hong-Kong)

== Company social policy ==
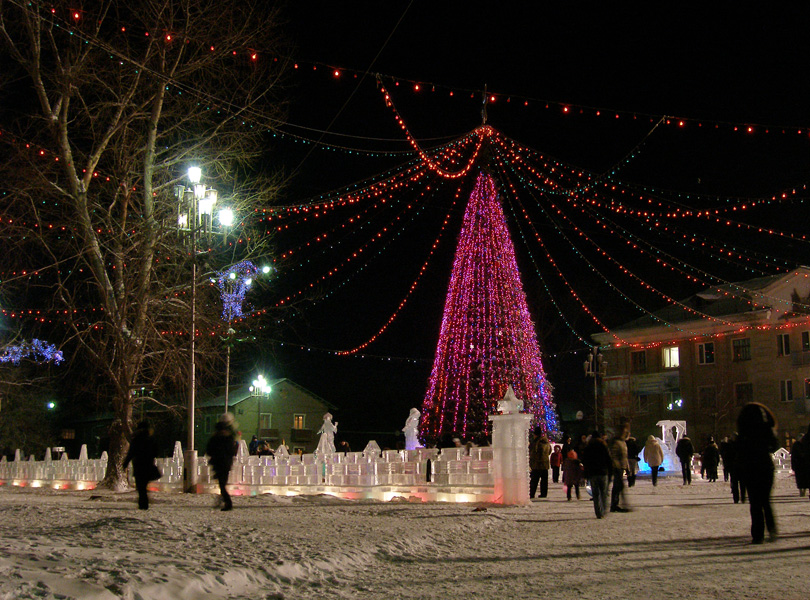
Chkalovsky Snow Town (January 2009)

Big number of large industrial enterprises in Kamensk-Uralsky resulted in lack of personnel and struggle for both workers and qualified engineers from the beginning of the 1950s. Solving the problem of housing was the main argument. Near the KUMZ site a new micro district has grown. It was named after Valery Chkalov. Ordinal habitation building pace in the 1980s was about 11000 m^{2} per year. Company looks after of kindergartens, medical care and leisure of the staff:

- In 1964 the House of sports «Metallurgist» was built.
- In 1966 works polyclinic launched, in 1967 KUMZ launched policlinic for children in Chkalov microdistrict.
- In 1967 boating station on Iset river started its work (now it is the only working boating station in town).
- In 1969 the Palace of culture «Metallurgist» was built.
- In 1979 new therapeutic building was launched.
- In 1991 plant acquires recreation department «Ray» situated on the bank of Chervyanoe Lake.
- In 1992 the building of new school with winter garden in Chkalov micro district was finished.

Two times a year competitions in football, volleyball, basketball, chess, checkers, and track-and-field athletics between workshops teams take place.

Every year on the eve of New Year on the square in front of Palace of culture «Metallurgist» KUMZ builds Chkalovsky town of ice and snow. Ice-hills, snow and ice figures of famous fairy tales characters and Ded Moroz with Snegurochka, New Year's trees with colored garlands are opened for all townsmen.

== Ecology ==
KUMZ as well as any of metallurgical enterprises harms the environment. In 2014 the contribution in atmosphere pollution of the plant was not marked as considerable in comparison to other enterprises of the region. KUMZ share in the discharge of sewage into the Iset River was 11.6% (3rd place in the town).
