= Jean-Marc Germain =

Jean-Marc Germain may refer to:

- Jean-Marc Germain (politician)
- Jean-Marc Germain (businessman)
