= Jean-Marc Germain (businessman) =

French-American businessman (born January 2, 1966)

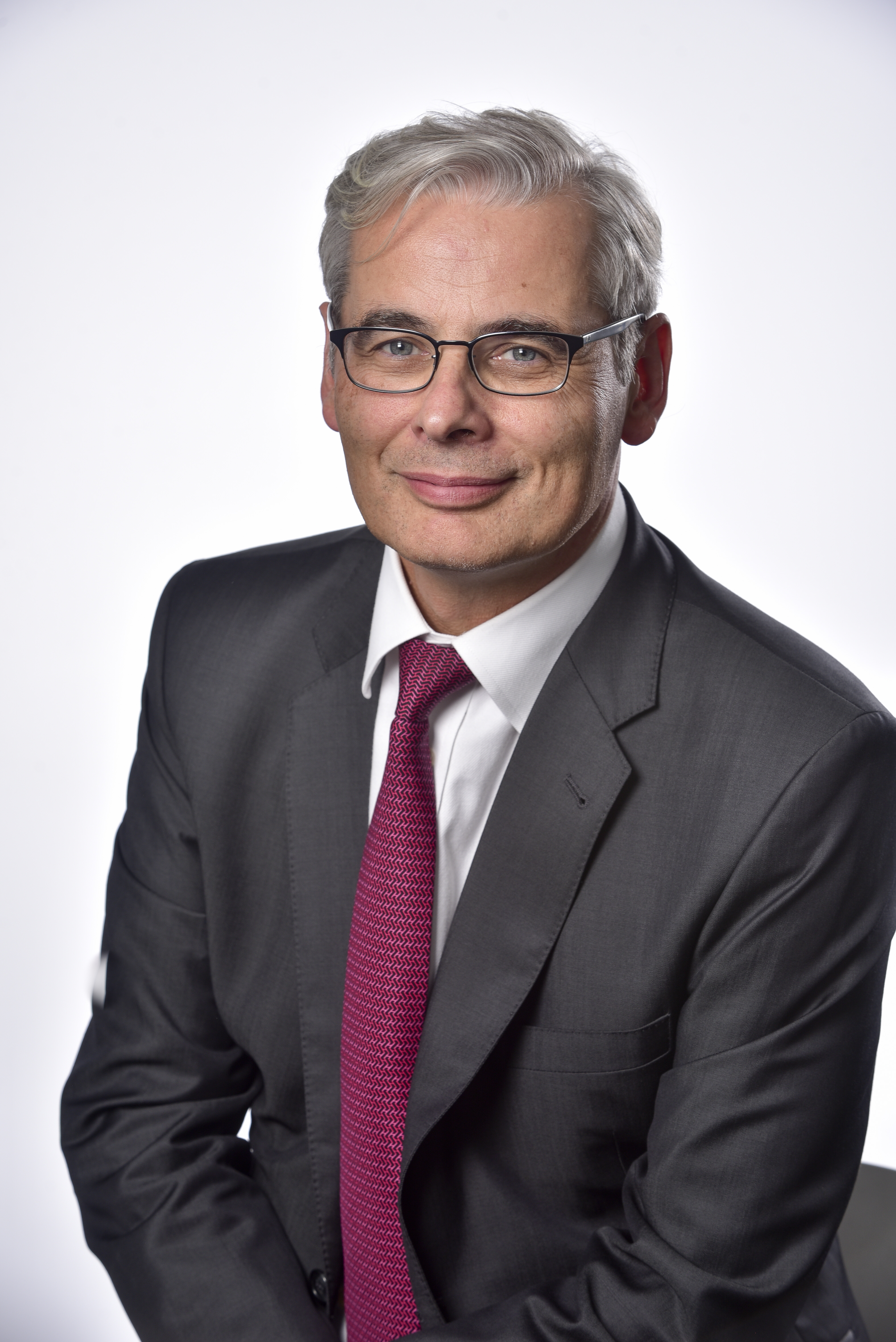
- Born: January 2, 1966 (age 60)
- Citizenship: French and American
- Education: École Polytechnique

Jean-Marc Germain (born January 2, 1966) is the former CEO of the global aluminium manufacturer Constellium. Under his leadership the company invested close to one billion euros in the automotive sector as the industry looks for lighter materials to reduce carbon dioxide emissions. He has also played a vocal role toward increasing the recycling capacity of aluminum and discouraging aluminum tariffs under the Trump administration.

Prior to joining Constellium, he was CEO of Algeco Scotsman and has held numerous leadership positions in the aluminium industry including executive roles in operations, sales & marketing, financial planning and strategy with Pechiney, Alcan and Novelis. Germain is a graduate of Ecole Polytechnique and a dual French and American citizen.
