= Accumulative roll bonding =

Accumulative roll bonding (ARB) is a severe plastic deformation (SPD) process. It is a method of rolling a stack of metal sheets, which are repeatedly rolled to a severe reduction ratio, sectioned into two halves, piled again and rolled. It has been often proposed as a method for the production of metal materials with ultrafine grain microstructure. ARB is a modification of repeated forging and folding method which has been in use since the end of Bronze Age or the beginning of Iron for sword making. The earliest works on modern ARB were by N. Tsuji, Y. Saito and co-workers. To obtain a single slab of a solid material, the rolling involves not only deformation, but also roll bonding.
