= GLARE =

Glass reinforced aluminium

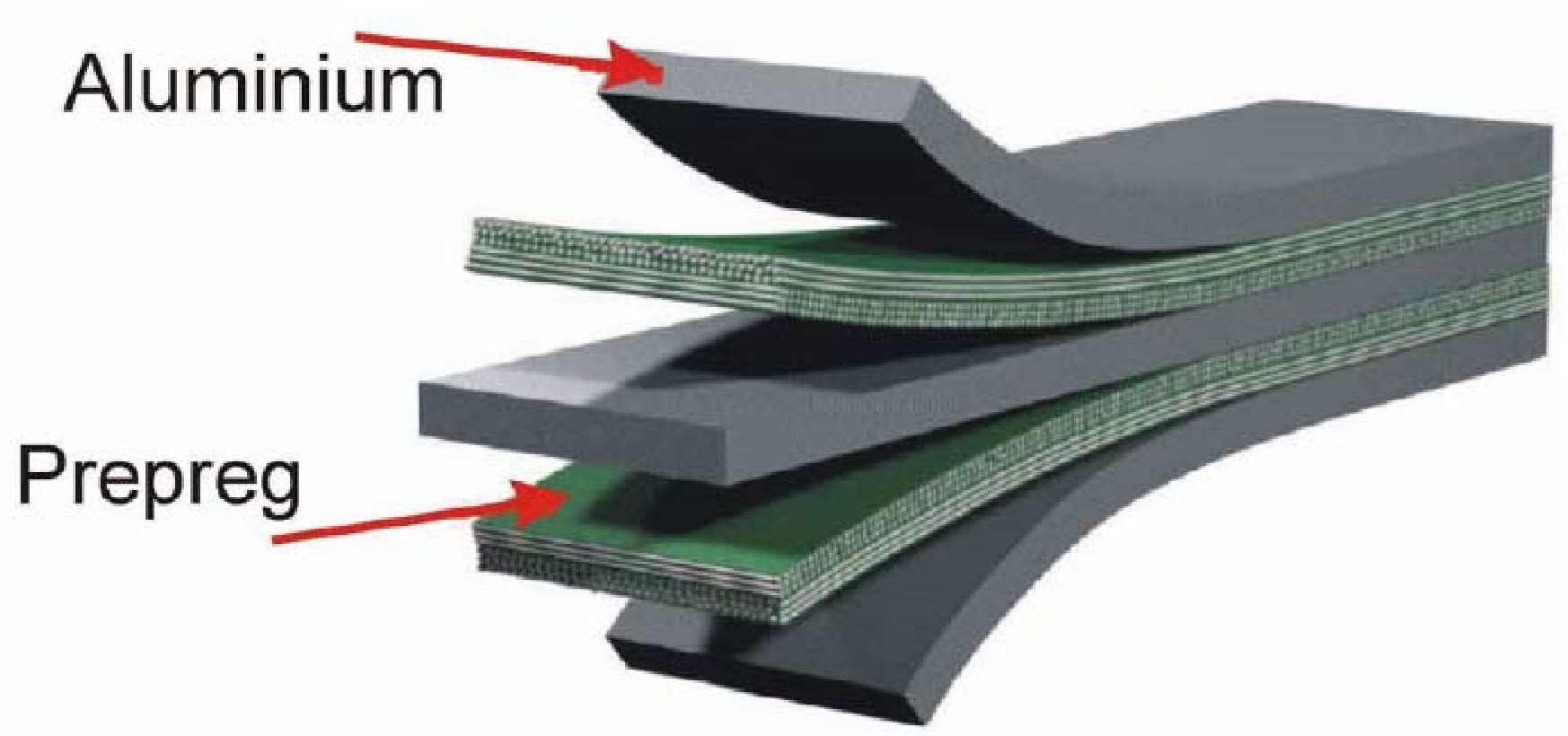
A component view of a Glare3-3/2 hybrid sheet. There are three layers of aluminum alternating with two layers of glass fiber. In a Glare3 grade, each glass fiber layer has two plies: one oriented at zero degrees, and the other oriented at ninety degrees.

Glare (derived from GLAss REinforced laminate) is a fiber metal laminate (FML) composed of several very thin layers of metal (usually aluminum) interspersed with layers of S-2 glass-fiber pre-preg, bonded together with a matrix such as epoxy. The uni-directional pre-preg layers may be aligned in different directions to suit predicted stress conditions.

Though Glare is a composite material, its material properties and fabrication are very similar to bulk aluminum sheets. It has far less in common with composite structures when it comes to design, manufacture, inspection, or maintenance. Glare parts are constructed and repaired using mostly conventional metal working techniques.

Its major advantages over conventional aluminum are:

- Better "damage tolerance" behavior, especially in impact and metal fatigue. Since the elastic strain is larger than other metal materials, it can consume more impact energy. It is dented more easily but has a higher penetration resistance.
- Better corrosion resistance.
- Better fire resistance.
- Lower specific weight.

Furthermore, the material can be tailored during design and manufacture so that the number, type and alignment of layers can suit the local stresses and shapes throughout the aircraft. This allows the production of double-curved sections, complex integrated panels, or very large sheets.

While a simple manufactured sheet of Glare is three to ten times more expensive than an equivalent sheet of aluminum, considerable production savings can be made using the aforementioned optimization. A structure built with Glare is lighter and less complex than an equivalent metal structure, requires less inspection and maintenance, and has a longer lifetime-till failure. These characteristics can make Glare cheaper, lighter, and safer to use in the long run.

== History ==
Glare is a relatively successful FML, patented by the Dutch company Akzo Nobel in 1987. It entered major application in 2007, when the Airbus A380 airliner began commercial service. Much of the research and development was done in the 1970s and 1980s at the Faculty of Aerospace Engineering, Delft University of Technology, where professors and researchers advanced the knowledge of FML and earned several patents, such as a splicing technique to build wider and longer panels without requiring external joints.

The development of FML reflects a long history of research that started in 1945 at Fokker, where earlier bonding experience at de Havilland inspired investigation into the improved properties of bonded aluminum laminates compared to monolithic aluminum. Later, the United States National Aeronautics and Space Administration (NASA) became interested in reinforcing metal parts with composite materials in the Space Shuttle program, which led to the introduction of fibers to the bond layers. Thus, the concept of FMLs was born.

Further research and co-operation of Fokker with Delft University, the Dutch aerospace laboratory NLR, 3M, Alcoa, and various other companies and institutions led to the first FML: the Aramid Reinforced ALuminum Laminates (ARALL), which combined aluminum with aramid fibers and was patented in 1981. This material had some cost, manufacturing, and application problems; while it had very high tensile strength, the material proved suboptimal in compressive strength, off-axis loading, and cyclic loading. These issues led to an improved version with glass fiber instead of aramid fibers.

Over the course of the development of the material, which took more than 30 years from start to the major application on the Airbus A380, many other production and development partners have been involved, including Boeing, McDonnell Douglas, Bombardier, and the US Air Force. Over the course of time, companies withdrew from this involvement, sometimes to come back after a couple of years. For example, Alcoa departed in 1995, returned in 2004, and withdrew again in 2010. It is alleged that disagreements between some of these partners caused Boeing to remove Glare from the cargo floor of the Boeing 777 in 1993 (before the aircraft's service entry in 1995) and blocked Bombardier's plans to use Glare in its CSeries aircraft in 2005. These strategic decisions show the dynamic nature of innovation processes.

== Applications ==
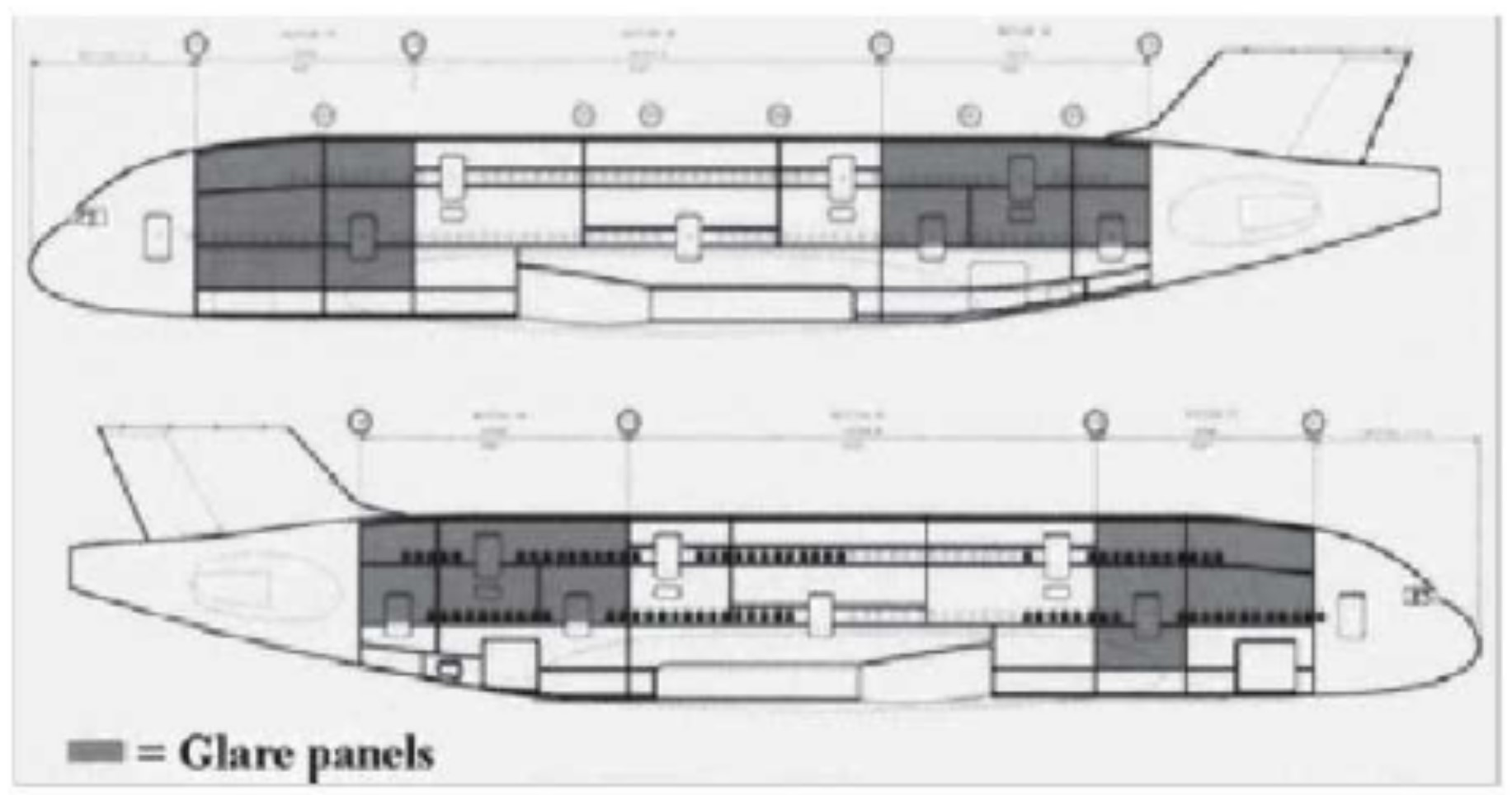
Areas of the Airbus 380 aircraft fuselage where the glass laminated aluminum reinforced epoxy (Glare) structural material is applied.

Glare has been most often applied in the aviation field. It forms part of the Airbus A380 fuselage and the leading edge of the tail surfaces. In 1995, an aircraft freight container made out of Glare became the first container certified by the Federal Aviation Administration (FAA) for blast resistance; the container can absorb and neutralize the explosion and fire from a bomb such as the one used in the Pan Am Flight 103 disaster over Lockerbie, Scotland in 1988. Glare has also been used in the front radome bulkhead of the Bombardier Learjet 45 business jet, which was first delivered in 1998. The material was used as a cargo liner solution for regional jets, in the lower skins of the flaps in the Lockheed Martin C-130J Super Hercules military transport aircraft, and in straps for the highest loaded frames in the Airbus A400M military transporter.

== Varieties and nomenclature ==
There are six standard Glare grades (Glare1 through Glare6) with typical densities ranging from 2.38 to 2.52 grams per cubic centimetre (0.086 to 0.091 lb/cu in), which is similar to the 2.46 to 2.49 g/cm^{3} (0.089 to 0.090 lb/cu in) density of S-2 glass fiber. These densities are smaller than the 2.78 g/cm^{3} (0.100 lb/cu in) density of 2024-T3 aluminum alloy, a common aluminum alloy in aircraft structures that is also incorporated into all but one of these Glare grades. (Glare1 uses the 7475-T761 alloy instead.) As the strength of the composite varies with fiber direction, the Glare grades differ by the number and complexity of pre-preg plies and orientations within a composite layer. Each Glare grade has A and B variants that have the same number of plies but with alternate fiber orientations. The standard Glare grades are cured in an autoclave at 120 °C (248 °F) for 3.5 hours under 11-bar pressure (11 atm; 160 psi; 1,100 kPa), and they use the FM94 epoxy pre-preg.

Standard Glare grades, ply orientations, and benefits
| Grade (ply orientations, in degrees) | Advantages |
|---|---|
| 1 (0°/0°) | Fatigue, strength, yield stress |
| 2A (0°/0°) | Fatigue, strength |
| 2B (90°/90°) | Fatigue, strength |
| 3A (0°/90°) | Fatigue, impact |
| 3B (90°/0°) | Fatigue, impact |
| 4A (0°/90°/0°) | Fatigue, strength in 0° direction |
| 4B (90°/0°/90°) | Fatigue, strength in 90° direction |
| 5A (0°/90°/90°/0°) | Impact |
| 5B (90°/0°/0°/90°) | Impact |
| 6A (+45°/-45°) | Shear, off-axis properties |
| 6B (-45°/+45°) | Shear, off-axis properties |

A single sheet of Glare may be referred to using the naming convention GLARE grade - Aluminum layers / Glass fiber layers - Aluminum layer thickness. The number of aluminum layers is always one more than the number of glass fiber layers, and the aluminum layer thickness is in millimeters, which can range from 0.2 to 0.5 mm (0.0079 to 0.0197 in; 7.9 to 19.7 mils). (Glare1 can only consist of aluminum layers of 0.3 to 0.4 mm (0.012 to 0.016 in; 12 to 16 mils) thickness, though.) For example, Glare4B-4/3-0.4 is a Glare sheet with a Glare4 grade (using the B variant) where there are four aluminum layers and three glass fiber layers, and the thickness of each aluminum layer is 0.4 mm (0.016 in; 16 mils). (In contrast, a typical sheet of photocopy paper is 0.097 mm (0.004 in; 4 mils) thick, while a typical business card is 0.234 mm (0.009 in; 9 mils) thick.)

The thickness of a Glare grade does not need to be separately specified, because each pre-preg ply has a nominal thickness of 0.125 mm (0.0049 in; 4.9 mils), and the number of plies is already defined for a Glare grade number. Glare grades 1, 2, 3, and 6 have just two plies of glass fibers, so the thickness of an individual glass fiber layer is 0.25 mm (0.0098 in; 9.8 mils). Glare4 has three plies, so its glass fiber layers are each 0.375 mm (0.0148 in; 14.8 mils) thick. Glare5 has four plies, with individual glass fiber layers of 0.5 mm (0.020 in; 20 mils) thickness. Glare sheets have typical overall thicknesses between 0.85 and 1.95 mm (0.033 and 0.077 in; 33 and 77 mils).

Other, less common grades and designations of aluminum/glass fiber hybrids also exist. A newer class of Glare, called High Static Strength Glare (HSS Glare), incorporates the 7475-T761 alloy and cures at 175 °C (347 °F) using FM906 epoxy pre-preg. HSS Glare comes in three grades (HSS Glare3, HSS Glare4A, and HSS Glare4B), mirroring the plies and orientations of their corresponding standard Glare grades. Russia, which at one point was going to incorporate Glare into its Irkut MS-21 narrowbody airliner, refers to its version of Glare as SIAL. The name is a translation from the Russian acronym for fiberglass and aluminum/plastic (С.И.А.Л.). It defines the grades SIAL-1 through SIAL-4, which usually contain the second-generation Russian aluminum-lithium alloy 1441 and range in density from 2.35 to 2.55 g/cm^{3} (0.085 to 0.092 lb/cu in). SIAL is used in the wing covering of the Beriev Be-103 amphibious seaplane. Airbus bases their material designations on the underlying aluminum alloy, using prefixes such as 2024-FML, 7475-FML, and 1441-FML instead of Glare and HSS Glare.

Comparison of Glare and aluminum Values in megapascals (MPa) and kips per square inch (ksi)
| Material | Al 2024-T3 | Glare3-4/3-0.4 |
|---|---|---|
| Tensile strength | 440 (64) | 620 (90) |
| Yield strength | 325 (47.1) | 284 (41.2) |
| Compressive strength | 270 (39) | 267 (38.7) |
| Bearing strength | 890 (129) | 943 (136.8) |
| Blunt notch strength | 410 (59) | 431 (62.5) |
| Young's modulus | 72,400 (10,500) | 58,100 (8,430) |
| Shear modulus | 27,600 (4,000) | 17,600 (2,550) |

== Airbus parts production ==
Glare contributes 485 square metres (5,220 sq ft) of material to each A380 plane. This material constitutes three percent by weight of the A380 structure, which has an operating empty weight (OEW) of 277,000 kg (610,700 lb; 277.0 t; 305.4 short tons). Because of the ten-percent lower density of Glare compared to a typical standalone aluminum alloy, Glare's usage on the A380 results in an estimated direct (volume-based) savings of 794 kg (1,750 lb; 0.794 t; 0.875 short tons), which doesn't include the follow-on weight savings in the entire aircraft structure that result from the lower material weight. For example, a 1996 internal Airbus study calculated that the weight savings from Glare in the upper fuselage would be 700 kg (1,500 lb; 0.70 t; 0.77 short tons) from just the lighter material, but it would total 1,200 kg (2,600 lb; 1.2 t; 1.3 short tons) due to the "snowball effects" of smaller engines, smaller landing gear, and other positive changes. (However, this is much smaller than an Airbus vice president's early claim that Glare would result in 15,000 to 20,000 kg (33,000 to 44,000 lb; 15 to 20 t; 17 to 22 short tons) of savings, presumably if it were used throughout most of the aircraft.)

To take advantage of Glare's higher tensile strength, 469 m^{2} (5,050 sq ft) is used on the upper fuselage of the front and rear sections. Glare was removed from the center upper fuselage in 2000 as shear strength precaution (although the Glare supplier felt it could have handled that area), and the fuselage underside is made of other materials with higher Young's modulus (stiffness) values to resist buckling.

In the fuselage, Glare2A is applied to stringers, Glare2B to butt straps, and Glare3 and Glare4B to the fuselage skins. Late in the A380 development process, the plane was found to be heavier than the original specifications, so Airbus replaced conventional aluminum with Glare5 as a weight-saving measure for the leading edges of the horizontal stabilizer and the vertical stabilizer, though at great expense. The A380 Glare fuselage skin panels have a minimum thickness of 1.6 mm (0.063 in; 63 mils) but can be much thicker, as some areas of the shells may need up to 30 layers of aluminum and 29 layers of glass fiber.

Glare is currently made by GKN-Fokker and Premium AEROTEC. GKN-Fokker manufactures 22 of the 27 A380 Glare fuselage shells at its 12,000 m^{2} facility (130,000 sq ft) in Papendrecht, Netherlands, which uses an autoclave with a length of 23 metres (75 ft) and a diameter of 5.5 m (18 ft). The company produces sheets of 3 by 12 m (9.8 by 39.4 ft), which incorporates the milling of door and window cutouts on a 5-axis milling machine. Premium AEROTEC manufactures the remaining five shells in Nordenham, Germany in an autoclave with a usable length of 15 m (49 ft) and an internal diameter of 4.5 m (15 ft). The company also produces the Glare2A butt straps for the A400 program. Its output was 200 m^{2} (2,200 sq ft) per month as of 2016.

With Airbus ending production of the A380 in 2021, Glare will go out of volume production unless it is selected for another airplane manufacturing program.

== Future developments ==
Since around 2014, Airbus, its two current Glare suppliers, and Stelia Aerospace have been collaborating to manufacture Glare in a high-volume, automated production setting that will deliver larger fuselage panels for aluminum aircraft. Using robots for tape laying and other tasks, automated production will involve a single-shot bonding process that will cure aluminum, pre-preg, stringer, and doublers simultaneously in the autoclave, followed by a single nondestructive testing (NDT) cycle, instead of the stringers and doublers requiring a second bonding and NDT cycle in the existing process. The belief is that the material will reduce fuselage weight by 15 to 25 percent compared to the aluminum sections they would replace on single-aisle aircraft such as the Boeing 737 and the Airbus A320. (Before the announcement of the A380 production stoppage, the automation program was also intended to lower the weight the A380 Glare sections by 350 kilograms (770 pounds; 0.35 metric tons; 0.39 short tons) at a manufacturing cost of 75% of the existing A380 Glare panels.)

To support these single-aisle aircraft production goals, GKN-Fokker planned to open an automated production line at its site in 2018, with a goal of manufacturing panels of up to 8 by 15 m (26 by 49 ft) in size and increasing the production rate by a factor of ten. In targeting a fifty-fold increase of Glare production capacity to 10,000 m^{2} (110,000 sq ft) per month, Premium AEROTEC planned to update its automated test cell in summer 2018 to manufacture demonstrator panels of 4 by 12 m (13 by 39 ft). This size will match the largest Glare panels to be potentially used by Airbus in short-range and medium-range aircraft. The Glare automation process for 2 by 6 m (6.6 by 19.7 ft) prototypes reached technology readiness level (TRL) 4 in late 2016, exceeded TRL 5 as of 2018, and has an eventual target of TRL 6.

In 2014, Embraer built and tested a 2.2 m diameter (7.2 ft; 2,200 mm; 87 in), 3 m long (9.8 ft) technology demonstrator that was partially made of FML and was based on the central fuselage of its ERJ-145 aircraft. Later, Embraer worked with Arconic (formerly Alcoa) to build a demonstrator for a lower wing skin composed of fiber-metal laminates, which contained sheets of 2524-T3 aluminum alloy and unidirectional plies of glass fiber. Embraer built and tested the wing demonstrator to increase the TRL of the FML manufacturing process so that it can be applied to future structural applications. Lower wing skins on single-aisle aircraft are thicker than fuselage skins, measuring at least 8 mm (0.31 in; 310 mils) thick overall and between 10 and 15 mm (0.39 and 0.59 in; 390 and 590 mils) thick between the fuselage and the engine mount.

== See also ==
- Fiber metal laminate
- Glass fiber
- Aluminum alloy
- Aluminum-lithium alloy
- Carbon fiber
- Airbus A380

== Bibliography ==
- Vermeeren, Coen, ed. (2002). Around GLARE: A new aircraft material in context. Dordrecht, Netherlands: Kluwer Academic Publishers. doi:10.1007/0-306-48385-8. ISBN 978-1-4020-0778-1. OCLC 50164548.
- Vlot, Ad; Gunnink, Jan Willem (2001). Fibre metal laminates: An introduction. Dordrecht, Netherlands: Kluwer Academic Publishers. doi:10.1007/978-94-010-0995-9. ISBN 978-1-4020-0391-2. OCLC 851368334.
- Vlot, Ad (2001). GLARE: History of the development of a new aircraft material. Dordrecht, Netherlands: Kluwer Academic Publishers. doi:10.1007/0-306-48398-X. ISBN 978-1-4020-0124-6. OCLC 751538109.
