= 2195 aluminium alloy =

Alloy of aluminium and lithium

2195 aluminium alloy is an alloy in the wrought aluminium-copper family (2000 or 2xxx series). It is one of the Weldalite family of Aluminium–lithium alloys. It is one of the most complex grades in the 2000 series, with at least 91.9% aluminium by weight. 2195 aluminium can be alternately referred to by the UNS designation A92195.

== Properties ==
Like most other aluminium-copper alloys, 2195 is a high-strength alloy, with bad workability, and poor corrosion resistance. Being highly alloyed, it tends to fall on the higher strength and lower corrosion resistance side. As a wrought alloy, it is not used in casting. It can be welded, particularly by friction stir welding, and is fracture resistant at cryogenic temperatures.

== Applications ==
The high strength to weight ratio of this alloy has resulted in its aerospace applications such as the Space Shuttle Super Lightweight external tank. It is 30 % stronger and 5 % less dense than the 2219 alloy used in the original Space Shuttle external tank.

2195 is used for the propellant tanks of the Falcon 9 Full Thrust orbital launcher, and for the new ULA Vulcan first stage.

== Chemical composition ==
The alloy composition of 2195 aluminium is:

- Aluminium: 91.9 to 94.9%
- Copper: 3.7 to 4.3%
- Lithium: 0.8 to 1.2%
- Magnesium: 0.25 to 0.8%
- Silver: 0.25 to 0.6%
- Zirconium: 0.08 to 0.16%
- Iron: 0.15% max
- Silicon: 0.12% max
- Titanium: 0.1% max
- Zinc: 0.25% max
- Residuals: 0.15% max
