= Fiber metal laminate =

Fiber metal laminate (FML) is one of a class of metallic materials consisting of a laminate of several thin metal layers bonded with layers of composite material. This allows the material to behave much as a simple metal structure, but with considerable specific advantages regarding properties such as metal fatigue, impact, corrosion resistance, fire resistance, weight savings, and specialized strength properties.

During the past decades, increasing demand in aircraft industry for high-performance, lightweight structures have stimulated a strong trend towards the development of refined models for fiber metal laminates (FMLs). Fiber metal laminates are hybrid composite materials built up from interlacing layers of thin metals and fiber reinforced adhesives. The most well known FMLs are:

- ARALL (aramid reinforced aluminum laminate), based on aramid fibers
- GLARE (glass reinforced aluminum laminate), based on high-strength glass fibers
- CentrAl, which surrounds a GLARE core with thicker layers of aluminum
- CARALL (carbon reinforced aluminum laminate), based on carbon fibers

Taking advantage of the hybrid nature from their two key constituents: metals (mostly aluminum) and fiber-reinforced laminate, these composites offer several advantages such as better damage tolerance to fatigue crack growth and impact damage especially for aircraft applications. Metallic layers and fiber reinforced laminate can be bonded by classical techniques, i.e. mechanically and adhesively. Adhesively bonded FMLs have been shown to be far more fatigue resistant than equivalent mechanically bonded structures.

Being mixtures of monolithic metals and composite materials, FMLs belong to the class of heterogeneous mixtures.
