= Copper-clad aluminium wire =

Type of electrical conductor

Copper-clad aluminium wire (CCAW or CCA) is a dual-metal electrical conductor composed of an inner aluminium core and outer copper cladding.

High-frequency alternating current (AC) travels mostly on the surface of a conductor, called the skin effect. Aluminum has higher resistance than copper, but is cheaper. Thus, CCA can have good conductivity and cost. For direct current (DC), CCA has higher resistance and/or requires a larger conductor.

== Production ==
A copper strip is formed into the shape of a cylinder, while it is being wrapped around an aluminium core and the edges of the copper strip are welded together. The assembly is then pulled through a die, where the cladded wire is squeezed and stretched while also improving the bonding between the copper and the aluminium core.

== Uses ==
CCA has gained significant traction in residential and commercial building markets due to its lower cost and inherent theft deterrence compared to traditional copper building wire. In addition, the lighter weight allows for faster installations and reduced construction cycle times.

Previously, the primary applications of this conductor revolve around weight reduction requirements. These applications include high-quality coils, such as the voice coils in headphones or portable loudspeakers; high frequency coaxial applications, such as RF antennas and cable television distribution cables.

CCA is also seen in counterfeit unshielded twisted pair networking cables. These cables are often less expensive than their full-copper counterparts, but the official specifications such as Category 6 require conductors to be pure copper. This has exposed the manufacturers or installers of cable with fake certification to legal liabilities. No known counterfeits of CCA low voltage building wire exist currently.

A common misconception of CCA is that it has the same termination issues as aluminium building wire. There is no known history of connection overheating problems associated with copper-clad aluminium wire.

== Properties ==
The properties of copper-clad aluminium wire include:

- Less expensive than a pure copper wire
- Lighter than pure copper
- Greater electrical efficiency when sized per NEC 310.16
- Higher strength than aluminium
- Electrical connections and terminations are identical to pure copper terminations

== Disadvantages ==
- In very niche applications where physical space is severely limited, upsizing from copper to CCA conductors could cause fill issues.
- CCA may be hard to solder.
- CCA may not meet some standards. For example, ANSI/TIA-568.2-D requires copper. A cable using CCA is non-compliant, which could be illegal and which may cause insurance/liability problems.

== Skin effect ==
The skin effect forces alternating current to flow on the outer periphery of any wire; in this case, the outer copper cladding of the conductor which has lower resistance than the mostly unused aluminium interior. The better conductor on the outer path causes the wire's resistance at high frequencies, where the skin effect is greater, to approach that of a pure copper wire. This improved conductivity over bare aluminium makes the copper-clad aluminium wire a good fit for radio frequency use.

The skin effect is similarly exploited in copper-clad steel wire, such as the center conductors of many coaxial cables, which are commonly used for high frequency feedlines with high strength and conductivity requirements.

== See also ==
- Copper conductor
- Graphene-clad wire
- Electroplating
- Galvanization
