= Bimetal =

Object made of two different metals joined together

Bimetal refers to an object that is composed of two separate metals joined together. Instead of being a mixture of two or more metals, like alloys, bimetallic objects consist of layers of different metals. Trimetal and tetrametal refer to objects composed of three and four separate metals respectively. A bimetal bar is usually made of brass and iron.

Shows the principle of non-heated (left) and heated (right) bimetal

Bimetallic strips and disks, which convert a temperature change into mechanical displacement, are the most recognized bimetallic objects due to their name. However, there are other common bimetallic objects. For example, tin cans consist of steel covered with tin. The tin prevents the can from rusting. To cut costs and prevent people from melting them down for their metal, coins are often composed of a cheap metal covered with a more expensive metal. For example, the United States penny was changed from 95% copper to 95% zinc, with a thin copper plating to retain its appearance. A common type of trimetallic object (before the all-aluminium can) was a tin-plated steel can with an aluminum lid with a pull tab. Making the lid out of aluminum allowed it to be pulled off by hand instead of using a can opener, but these cans proved difficult to recycle owing to their mix of metals.

Blades for bandsaws and reciprocating saws are often made with bimetal construction. The teeth, made of high-speed steel, are bonded (by various methods, for example, electron beam welding or laser beam welding) to the softer high-carbon steel base. Such construction makes for blades with a better combination of cutting speed and durability than shown by non-bimetal blades, because the advantages and disadvantages of each of the metals are applied in the best locations: the teeth are harder (and thus cut better), but therefore also brittler; meanwhile, the body area of the band is softer (which would make for poorer teeth), but also less brittle, and thus more resistant to cracking and breaking (which is desirable in the body area).

== See also ==
- Bimetallic strip
- Bimetallism
- Bi-metallic coin
- Thermocouple (electric)
- Copper-clad steel
