= John Ferreol Monnot =

American metallurgical and mining engineer

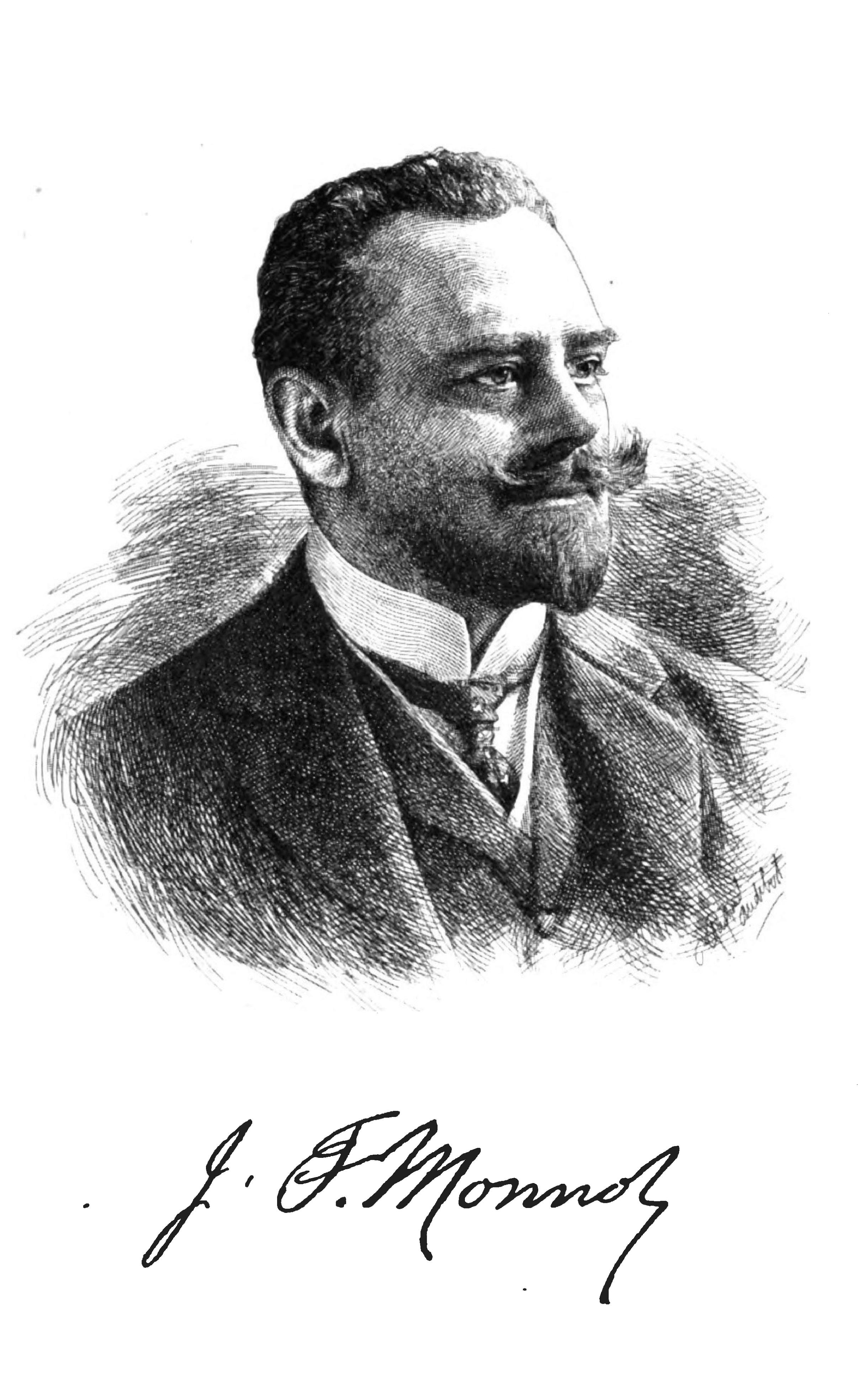
John Ferreol Monnot, metallurgist, the inventor of the first successful process for manufacturing copper-clad steel

John Ferreol Monnot (Jean Baptiste Ferréol Ponsot Monnot; 23 October 1866 – 24 May 1943) was an American metallurgical and mining engineer. He is best known for inventing the first successful process for manufacturing copper-clad steel.

== Biography ==
Monnot was born at Clason Point, Westchester County (now Bronx), New York, in 1866, the son of French parents Jean Baptiste Monnot and Louise Émilie Ponsot. His father immigrated to the United States in 1821 at the age of sixteen, and became a man of means and influence.

Monnot was educated entirely abroad, entering the Lycée St. Louis, Paris, France at eight years of age, and subsequently the École polytechnique de l'université Paris-Sud. Later, at the request of the United States government, he was received at the École Nationale Superieure des Mines de Paris, where he was graduated in 1888 as metallurgical and mining engineer.

After spending three years in mining and metallurgical establishments in France, Belgium and Germany, to complete his practical education, he became general manager of a steel foundry at Charleville, France.

== Mining activities ==
In 1893, Monnot was retained by a group of capitalists to go to Caracas, Venezuela, and report on a copper mine El Chacao in Guárico. Here he found the mining resources so great that he remained for several years actively engaged in exploring and working different mining properties; discovering very valuable iron ore deposits on the south bank of the Orinoco river; also serving as consulting engineer for the Chacao Gold Mining Co. in Venezuela in 1893-94, and as general manager of the Pedernales Asphalt Mines in 1894-95. During 1899-1901 he was general manager of Lo Improvisto Gold Mining Co.

== Inventions ==
From 1901, Monnot was engaged in metallurgical researches. He discovered different processes for welding coatings of metals, such as copper and silver on steel cores, for which he obtained patents in all countries. The most valuable of these was his process for welding copper to steel, the new product being called Monnot copper-clad steel, and as a result copper and steel were commercially welded together for the first time in such form that a steel core could be produced with a copper coating of any desired thickness. The weld between the two metals was autogenous and so complete at all meeting points that co-extension took place without any separation of the component metals. The commercial value of the product lay in the fact that the strength and durability of the metal were increased and the cost very materially decreased. He also patented a process for obtaining homogeneous and sound castings of metals, which was of great advantage in the making of steel ingots, as it improved the quality and reduced the cost.

Monnot divided his time between New York, where he was consulting engineer for the Duplex Metals Co., and Paris and London, where he introduced the manufacture of his metals. In the United States his patents were exploited by the Duplex Metals Co. of New York, of which he was president from 1905 to 1908, when he resigned to extend his work abroad. Among his lesser achievements were a process of extracting rubber from bark and leaves of trees, and improvements in steam heating and electric lighting systems. He was a director of the Duplex Metals Co. and the Hudson Wire Co., and a member of the Association of Mining Engineers of Paris and of the Engineers Club of New York.

He was married in New York City, December, 1895, to the Comtesse de Laredo, of Bone, Algeria. He died in Paris of liver cancer and was buried at Père Lachaise Cemetery.
