= Roll bonding =

Technique to link metal

Roll bonding is a solid state, cold welding process, obtained through flat rolling of sheet metals. In roll bonding, two or more layers of different metals are passed through a pair of flat rollers under sufficient pressure to bond the layers. The pressure is high enough to deform the metals and reduce the combined thickness of the clad material. The mating surfaces must be previously prepared (scratched, cleaned, degreased) in order to increase their friction coefficient and remove any oxide layers. The process can be performed at room temperature or at warm conditions. In warm roll bonding, heat is applied to pre-heat the sheets just before rolling, in order to increase their ductility and improve the strength of the weld. The strength of the rolled bonds depends on the main process parameters, including the rolling conditions (entry temperature of the sheets, amount of thickness reduction, rolling speed, etc.), the pre-rolling treatment conditions (annealing temperature and time, surface preparation techniques, etc.) and the post-rolling heat treatments.

== Applications ==
The applications of roll bonding can be used for cladding of metal sheets, or as a sub-step of the accumulative roll bonding. Bonding of the sheets can be controlled by painting a pattern on one sheet; only the bare metal surfaces bond, and the un-bonded portion can be inflated if the sheet is heated and the coating vaporizes. This is used to make heat exchangers for refrigeration equipment.
