= Copper-clad steel =

Bi-metallic product

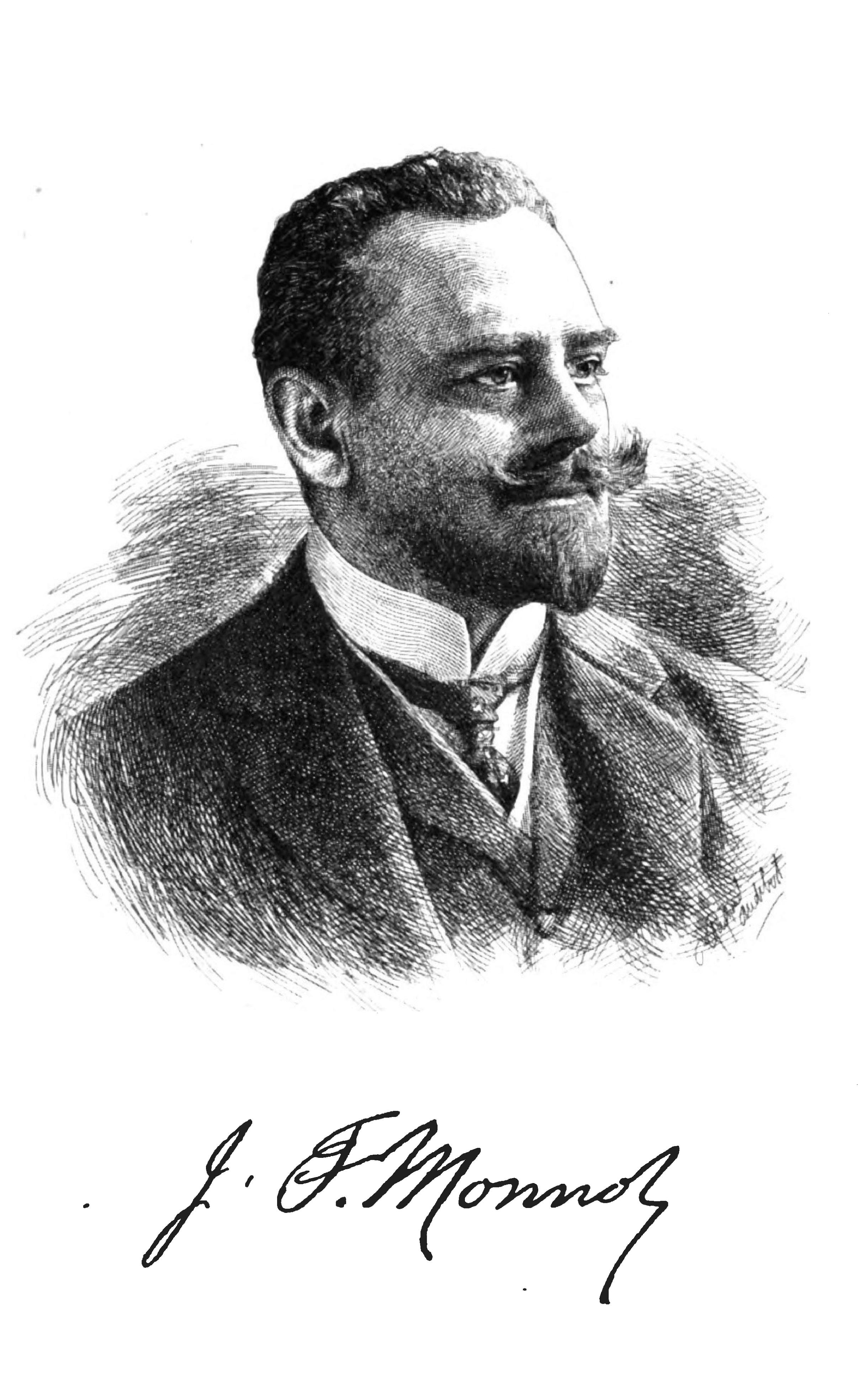
John Ferreol Monnot, metallurgist, the inventor of the first successful process for manufacturing copper-clad steel.

Copper-clad steel (CCS), also known as copper-covered steel or the trademarked name Copperweld, is a bi-metallic product, mainly used in the wire industry that combines the high mechanical strength of steel with the conductivity and corrosion resistance of copper.

It is mainly used for grounding purposes, line tracing to locate underground utilities, drop wire of telephone cables, and inner conductor of coaxial cables, including thin hookup cables like RG-174 and CATV cable. It is also used in some antennas for RF conducting wires.

== History ==
The first recorded attempt to make copper clad steel wire took place in the early 1860s. Although for over 100 years people had been suggesting various ways of uniting copper and steel, it was not until the period mentioned that Farmer and Milliken tried wrapping a strip of copper about a steel wire. American engineers in 1883 and again in the 1890s made attempts to produce a copper-steel wire, in one instance at least, by electroplating copper on steel.

The Duplex Metals Co. traces its beginning to John Ferreol Monnot between 1900 and 1905. He had been very interested in the work of Mr. Martin in Paris.

"After several years devoted to experimenting, [he] organized the Duplex Metals Company. Prior to his discovery of the process under which this company operates in producing its copper clad, probably almost every other possible way of welding copper and steel together had been tried by Mr. Monnot, but found useless for the purpose."

== Uses ==
Copper-clad steel wire find applications in grounding, connection of ground rods to metallic structures, ground grid meshes, substations, power installations, and lightning arresters. This wire is also sometimes used for power transmission.

Copper coated welding wire has become common since wire welding equipment has become popular.

Copper-clad steel is occasionally used for making durable radio antennas, where its HF conductivity is nearly identical to a same-diameter solid copper conductor. It is most often used in antennas with long spans of unsupported wire, which need extra strength to withstand high tension which would cause solid copper or aluminum wire to break or stretch excessively.

== Properties ==
The main properties of these conductors include:

- Good corrosion resistance of copper
- High tensile strength of steel
- Resistance against material fatigue

== Advantages ==
Since the outer conductor layer is low-impedance copper, and only the center is higher impedance steel, the skin effect gives RF transmission lines with heavy copper-cladding a low impedance at high frequencies, equivalent to that of a solid copper wire.

Tensile strength of copper-clad steel conductors is greater than that of ordinary copper conductors permitting greater span lengths than with copper.

Another advantage is that smaller diameter copper-clad steel conductors may be used in coaxial cables, permitting higher impedance and smaller cable diameter than with copper conductors of similar strength.

Due to the inseparable union of the two metals and the low amount of the more costly one, it deters theft since copper recovery is impractical and thus has very little scrap value.

Installations with copper-clad steel conductors are generally accepted as fulfilling the legal specifications for a good electrical ground. For this reason its use is preferred by industrial companies and utilities when cost is a concern.

== See also ==
- Copper conductor
- Copper-clad aluminium wire
