= Constellium =

French aluminium product manufacturer

Constellium SE
- Type: Public (Societas Europaea)
- Traded as: NYSE: CSTM
- Industry: Aluminium production and recycling
- Founded: 2011
- Headquarters: Paris, France
- Key people: Ingrid Joerg (CEO) Jack Guo, CFO
- Revenue: ▲US$8.4 billion (2025)
- Net income: ▲US$275 million (2025)
- Total assets: US$5.354 billion (2025)
- Total equity: US$971 million (2025)
- Number of employees: ≈11,500 (2025)
- Website: www.constellium.com

Constellium SE is a French-based manufacturer and recycler of aluminium rolled products, extruded products and structural components. Constellium primarily serves the aerospace, automotive, and packaging sectors.

== History ==
Constellium was created when Rio Tinto sold off Alcan Engineered Products to Apollo Management (51%) and FSI (10%) in 2011. Prior to that, Alcan Engineered Products was the result of various mergers and acquisitions between Pechiney, Alcan and Alusuisse. Constellium was listed on the New York Stock Exchange in 2013. In 2015, it completed the acquisition of Wise Metals for approximately $1.4 billion including debt to expand its North American rolled-products and automotive-sheet operations. In February 2018, Constellium delisted its shares from Euronext Paris. In 2019, the company changed its legal form from Constellium N.V., a Dutch public limited company, to Constellium SE, a European company.

== Operations ==
Constellium employs approximately 11,500 people worldwide and operates 23 manufacturing sites in North America, Europe and Asia. The company is headquartered in Paris with corporate offices in Baltimore and Zurich.

Constellium reports its activities through three operating segments: Aerospace & Transportation, Packaging & Automotive Rolled Products, and Automotive Structures & Industry.

The Aerospace & Transportation segment produces aluminium plate, sheet and extruded products for commercial aerospace, defense, space, transportation and industrial applications. Its production facilities are located in Issoire, France, Ravenswood, West Virginia, and Switzerland.

The Packaging & Automotive Rolled Products segment manufactures aluminium sheet and coil for beverage cans, food and other packaging, automotive body sheet and specialty industrial applications. The segment operates facilities in Neuf-Brisach, France, Muscle Shoals, Alabama, Bowling Green, Kentucky, and Singen, Germany.

The Automotive Structures & Industry segment designs and manufactures extruded profiles and structural components, including crash-management systems, body structures, battery enclosures and components for automotive and industrial applications. The segment operates facilities in Europe, North America and Asia.

=== Research and development ===
Constellium operates three research and development centers, located in: Voreppe, France; Plymouth, Michigan; and at Brunel University of London.

Founded in 1967, Constellium's C-TEC Technology Center is a research and development center located in Voreppe, France. C-TEC specializes in product and process development, product testing and technical assistance to Constellium's manufacturing facilities and customers. During the last 50 years, C-TEC has added more than 600 patent families and trademarks. C-TEC maintains a staff of over 200 R&D technicians and engineers.

Launched in 2013, the Advanced Light Metals Processing Research Center, a collaboration between Constellium, Brunel University and Jaguar Land Rover, was opened as an innovation center dedicated to the automotive industry. In 2016, the partnership between Constellium and Brunel was extended with the opening of the Constellium University Technology Center (UTC), a research center for the design, development and prototyping of aluminium alloys and automotive structural components. In 2016, Constellium opened an additional research hub dedicated to lightweight automotive aluminium in Plymouth, Michigan.

In 2025, Reuters reported that Constellium was testing lower-density alloys, new manufacturing processes and ways to increase aluminium recycling. According to Philippe Hoffmann, president of the company's Aerospace and Transportation business, tests of a wing concept using new alloys and a welding process that eliminates the need for rivets had demonstrated a weight saving of 20%. He also said that friction stir welding could enable greater automation in aircraft-panel manufacturing. Constellium was studying improved recovery of production scrap by alloy, as well as the recovery of aluminium from aircraft at the end of their operational lives.

== Recycling in the aluminium industry ==
Constellium is a founding member of the Aluminium Stewardship Initiative (ASI), a global, multi-stakeholder, non-profit organization for the aluminium industry.

Constellium operates recycling facilities in North America and Europe, including in Muscle Shoals, Alabama, and Neuf-Brisach, France. In 2025, the company reported an annual recycling capacity of over 750,000 metric tons.
