= Aluminium alloy =

Alloy in which aluminium is the predominant metal

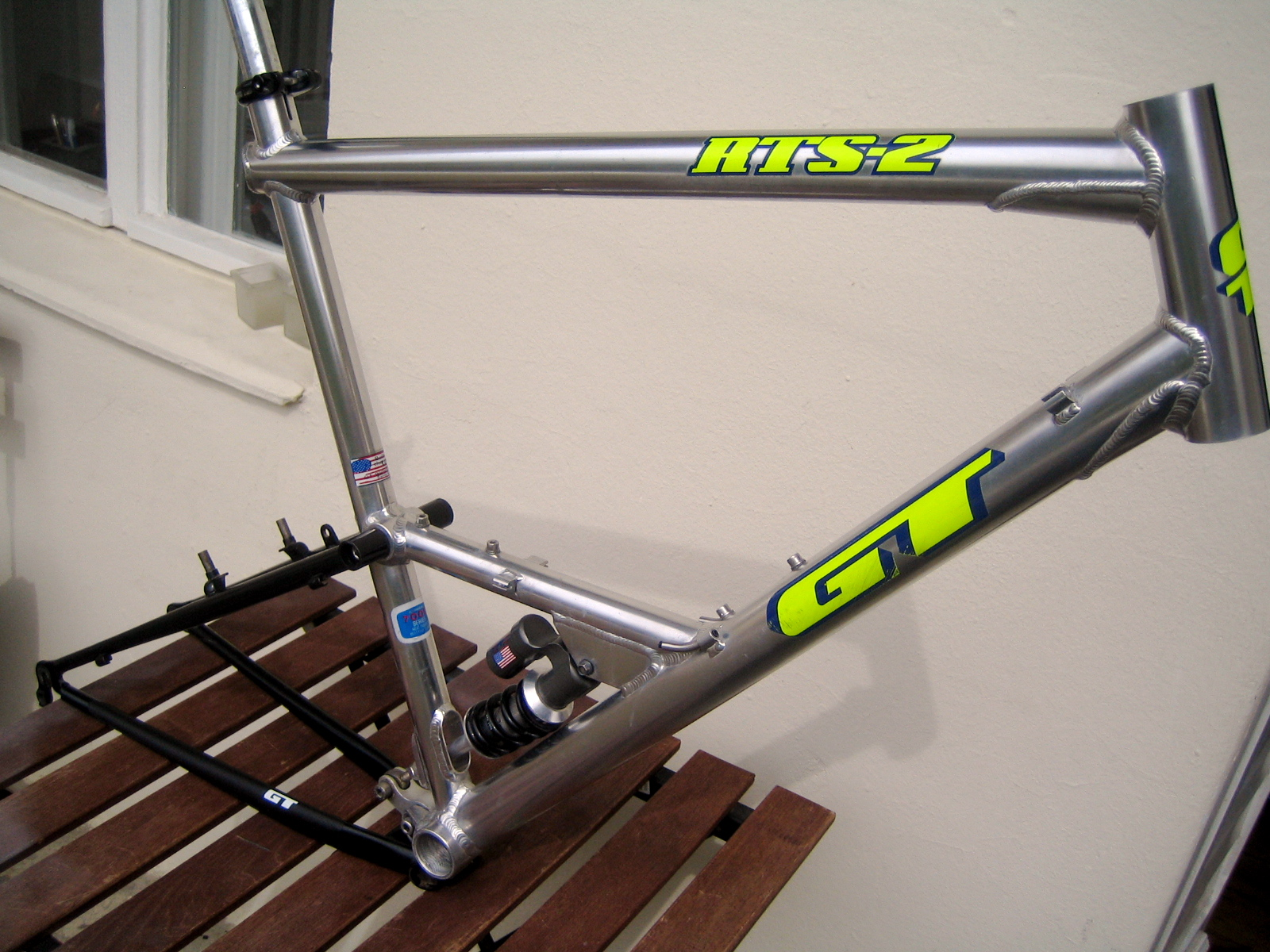
Welded aluminium alloy bicycle frame, made in the 1990s

An aluminium alloy (UK/IUPAC) or aluminum alloy (NA; see spelling differences) is an alloy in which aluminium (Al) is the predominant metal. The typical alloying elements are copper, magnesium, manganese, silicon, tin, nickel and zinc. There are two principal classifications, namely casting alloys and wrought alloys, both of which are further subdivided into the categories heat-treatable and non-heat-treatable. About 85% of aluminium is used for wrought products, for example rolled plate, foils and extrusions. Cast aluminium alloys yield cost-effective products due to their low melting points, although they generally have lower tensile strengths than wrought alloys. The most important cast aluminium alloy system is Al–Si, where the high levels of silicon (4–13%) contribute to give good casting characteristics. Aluminium alloys are widely used in engineering structures and components where light weight or corrosion resistance is required.

Alloys composed mostly of aluminium have been very important in aerospace manufacturing since the introduction of metal-skinned aircraft. Aluminium–magnesium alloys are both lighter than other aluminium alloys and much less flammable than other alloys that contain a very high percentage of magnesium.

Aluminium alloy surfaces will develop a white, protective layer of aluminium oxide when left unprotected by anodizing or correct painting procedures. In a wet environment, galvanic corrosion can occur when an aluminium alloy is placed in electrical contact with other metals with more positive corrosion potentials than aluminium, and an electrolyte is present that allows ion exchange. Also referred to as dissimilar-metal corrosion, this process can occur as exfoliation or as intergranular corrosion. Aluminium alloys can be improperly heat-treated, causing internal element separation which corrodes the metal from the inside out.

Aluminium alloy compositions are registered with The Aluminum Association. Many organizations publish more specific standards for the manufacture of aluminium alloys, including the SAE International standards organization, specifically its aerospace standards subgroups, and ASTM International.

== Engineering use & properties ==
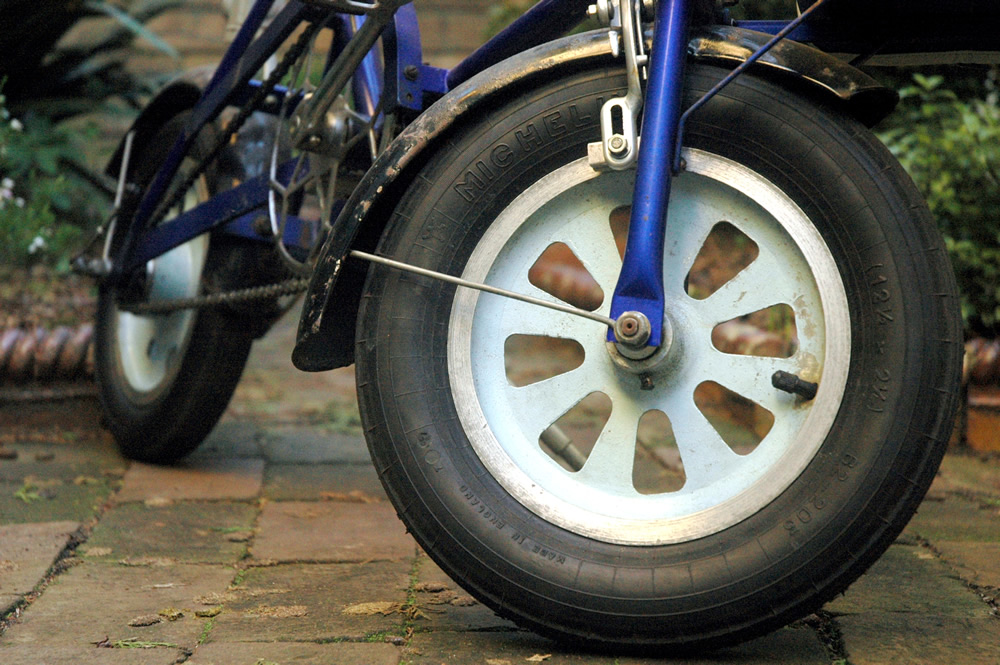
Aluminium alloy bicycle wheel. 1960s Bootie Folding Cycle

Aluminium alloys with a wide range of properties are used in engineering structures. Alloy systems are classified by a number system (ANSI) or by names indicating their main alloying constituents (DIN and ISO). Selecting the right alloy for a given application entails considerations of its tensile strength, density, ductility, formability, workability, weldability, and corrosion resistance, to name a few. A brief historical overview of alloys and manufacturing technologies is given in. Aluminium alloys are used extensively in aircraft due to their high strength-to-weight ratio. Pure aluminium is much too soft for such uses, and it does not have the high tensile strength that is needed for building airplanes and helicopters.

=== Aluminium alloys versus types of steel ===
Aluminium alloys typically have elastic moduli of about 70 GPa, which is about one-third of the elastic modulus of steel alloys. Therefore, for a given load, a component or unit made of an aluminium alloy will experience a greater deformation in the elastic regime than a steel part of identical size and shape. With completely new metal products, the design choices are often governed by the choice of manufacturing technology. Extrusions are particularly important in this regard, owing to the ease with which aluminium alloys, particularly the Al-Mg-Si series, can be extruded to form complex profiles.

In general, stiffer and lighter designs can be achieved with aluminium alloys than is feasible with steels. For instance, consider the bending of a thin-walled tube: the second moment of area is inversely related to the stress in the tube wall; that is, stresses are lower for larger values. The second moment of area is proportional to the cube of the radius times the wall thickness, so increasing the radius (and weight) by 26% will lead to a halving of the wall stress. For this reason, bicycle frames made of aluminium alloys make use of larger tube diameters than steel or titanium in order to yield the desired stiffness and strength. In automotive engineering, cars made of aluminium alloys employ space frames made of extruded profiles to ensure rigidity. This represents a radical change from the common approach for current steel car design, which depend on the body shells for stiffness, known as unibody design.

Aluminium alloys are widely used in automotive engines, particularly in engine blocks and crankcases due to the weight savings that are possible. Since aluminium alloys are susceptible to warping at elevated temperatures, the cooling system of such an engine is critical. Manufacturing techniques and metallurgical advancements have also been instrumental for successful applications in automotive engines. In the 1960s, the aluminium cylinder heads of the Chevrolet Corvair earned a reputation for failure and stripping of threads, which is not seen in current aluminium cylinder heads.

An important structural limitation of aluminium alloys is their lower fatigue strength compared to steel. In controlled laboratory conditions, steels display a fatigue limit, which is the stress amplitude below which no failures occur – the metal does not continue to weaken with extended stress cycles. Aluminium alloys do not have this lower fatigue limit and will continue to weaken with continued stress cycles. Aluminium alloys are therefore sparsely used in parts that require high fatigue strength in the high-cycle regime (more than 10^{7} stress cycles).

=== Heat sensitivity considerations ===
Often, the metal's sensitivity to heat must also be considered. Even a relatively routine workshop procedure involving heating is complicated by the fact that aluminium, unlike steel, will melt without first glowing red. Forming operations where a blow torch is used can reverse or remove the effects of heat treatment. No visual signs reveal how the material is internally damaged. Much like welding heat-treated, high-strength link chain, all strength is now lost by heat of the torch. The chain is dangerous and must be discarded.

Aluminium is subject to internal stresses and strains. Sometimes years later, improperly welded aluminium bicycle frames may gradually twist out of alignment from the stresses of the welding process. Thus, the aerospace industry avoids heat altogether by joining parts with rivets of like-metal composition, other fasteners, or adhesives.

Stresses in overheated aluminium can be relieved by heat-treating the part in an oven and gradually cooling it—in effect annealing the stresses. Yet these parts may still become distorted, so that heat-treating of welded bicycle frames, for instance, can result in a significant fraction becoming misaligned. If the misalignment is not too severe, the cooled parts may be bent into alignment. If the frame is properly designed for rigidity (see above), that bending will require enormous force.

Aluminium's intolerance of high temperatures has not precluded its use in rocketry, even for use in constructing combustion chambers where gases can reach 3500 K. The RM-81 Agena upper-stage engine used a regeneratively cooled aluminium design for some parts of the nozzle, including the thermally critical throat region; in fact, the extremely high thermal conductivity of aluminium prevented the throat from reaching the melting point even under massive heat flux, resulting in a reliable, lightweight component.

=== Household wiring ===
Because of its high conductivity and relatively low price compared with copper in the 1960s, aluminium was introduced at that time for household electrical wiring in North America, even though many fixtures had not been designed to accept aluminium wire. But the new use brought some problems:

- The greater coefficient of thermal expansion of aluminium causes the wire to expand and contract relative to the dissimilar-metal screw connection, eventually loosening the connection.
- Pure aluminium has a tendency to creep under steady sustained pressure (to a greater degree as the temperature rises), again loosening the connection.
- Galvanic corrosion from the dissimilar metals increases the electrical resistance of the connection.

All of this resulted in overheated and loose connections, and this in turn resulted in some fires. Builders then became wary of using the wire, and many jurisdictions outlawed its use in very small sizes, in new construction. Yet newer fixtures were eventually introduced with connections designed to avoid loosening and overheating. At first they were marked "Al/Cu", but they now bear a "CO/ALR" coding.

Another way to forestall the heating problem is to crimp the short "pigtail" of copper wire. A properly done high-pressure crimp by the proper tool is tight enough to reduce any thermal expansion of the aluminium. Today, new alloys, designs, and methods are used for aluminium wiring in combination with aluminium terminations.

== Alloy designations ==
Wrought and cast aluminium alloys use different identification systems. Wrought aluminium is identified with a four-digit number which identifies the alloying elements.

Cast aluminium alloys use a four-to-five-digit number with a decimal point. The digit in the hundreds place indicates the alloying elements, while the digit after the decimal point indicates the form (cast shape or ingot).

=== Temper designation ===
The temper designation follows the cast or wrought designation number with a dash, a letter, and potentially a one-to-three-digit number, e.g. 6061-T6. The definitions for the tempers are:

-F : As fabricated
-H : Strain-hardened (cold worked) with or without thermal treatment

-H1 : Strain-hardened without thermal treatment
-H2 : Strain-hardened and partially annealed
-H3 : Strain-hardened and stabilized by low-temperature heating
-H4 : Strain-hardened, then lacquered/painted

Second digit : A second digit denotes the degree of hardness

-HX2 = 1/4 hard
-HX4 = 1/2 hard
-HX6 = 3/4 hard
-HX8 = full hard
-HX9 = extra hard

-O : Full soft (annealed)
-T : Heat-treated to produce stable tempers

-T1 : Cooled from hot-working and naturally aged (at room temperature)
-T2 : Cooled from hot-working, cold-worked, and naturally aged
-T3 : Solution heat-treated and cold worked
-T4 : Solution heat-treated and naturally aged
-T5 : Cooled from hot-working and artificially aged (at elevated temperature)

-T51 : Stress relieved by stretching

-T510 : No further straightening after stretching
-T511 : Minor straightening after stretching

-T52 : Stress relieved by thermal treatment

-T6 : Solution heat-treated and artificially aged

-T651 : Solution heat-treated, stress relieved by stretching, and artificially aged

-T7 : Solution heat-treated and stabilized
-T8 : Solution heat-treated, cold-worked, and artificially aged
-T9 : Solution heat-treated, artificially aged, and cold-worked
-T10 : Cooled from hot-working, cold-worked, and artificially aged

-W : Solution heat-treated only

Note: -W is a relatively soft intermediary designation that applies after heat treat and before aging is completed. The -W condition can be extended at extremely low temperatures but not indefinitely and depending on the material will typically last no longer than 15 minutes at ambient temperatures.

== Wrought alloys ==
The International Alloy Designation System is the most widely accepted naming scheme for wrought alloys. Each alloy is given a four-digit number, where the first digit indicates the major alloying elements, the second—if different from 0—indicates a variation of the alloy, and the third and fourth digits identify the specific alloy in the series. For example, in alloy 3105, the number 3 indicates the alloy is in the manganese series, 1 indicates the first modification of alloy 3005, and finally 05 identifies it in the 3000 series.

=== 1000 series (essentially pure) ===
1000 series are essentially pure aluminium with a minimum 99% aluminium content by weight and can be work hardened.

1000 series aluminium alloy nominal composition (% weight) and applications
Alloy	Al contents	Alloying elements	Uses and refs
1050	99.5	–	Drawn tube, chemical equipment
1060	99.6	–	Universal
1070	99.7	–	Thick-wall drawn tube
1100	99.0	Cu 0.05–0.20, Fe 0.95 max, Mn 0.05 max, Si 0.95 max, Zn 0.1 max, Residuals: 0.15 max	Universal, holloware
1145	99.45	–	Sheet, plate, foil
1199	99.99	–	Foil
1200	99.0 max	(Si + Fe) 1.0 max; Cu 0.05 max; Mn 0.05 max; Zn 0.10 max; Ti 0.05 max; others 0.05 (each) .015 (total)	
1230 (VAD23)^{#}		Si 0.3; Fe 0.3; Cu 4.8–5.8; Mn 0.4–0.8; Mg 0.05; Zn 0.1; Ti 0.15; Li 0.9–1.4; Cd 0.1–0.25	Tu-144 aircraft
1350	99.5	–	Electrical conductors
1370	99.7	–	Electrical conductors
1420^{#}	92.9	Mg 5.0; Li 2.0; Zr 0.1	Aerospace
1421^{#}	92.9	Mg 5.0; Li 2.0; Mn 0.2; Sc 0.2; Zr 0.1	Aerospace
1424^{#}		Si 0.08; Fe 0.1; Mn 0.1–0.25; Mg 4.7–5.2; Zn 0.4–0.7; Li 1.5–1.8; Zr 0.07–0.1; Be 0.02–0.2; Sc 0.05–0.08; Na 0.0015	
1430^{#}		Si 0.1; Fe 0.15; Cu 1.4–1.8; Mn 0.3–0.5; Mg 2.3–3.0; Zn 0.5–0.7; Ti 0.01–0.1; Li 1.5–1.9; Zr 0.08–0.14; Be 0.02–0.1; Sc 0.01–0.1; Na 0.003; Ce 0.2–0.4; Y 0.05–0.1	
1440^{#}		Si 0.02–0.1; Fe 0.03–0.15; Cu 1.2–1.9; Mn 0.05; Mg 0.6–1.1; Cr 0.05; Ti 0.02–0.1; Li 2.1–2.6; Zr 0.10–0.2; Be 0.05–0.2; Na 0.003	
1441^{#}		Si 0.08; Fe 0.12; Cu 1.5–1.8; Mn 0.001–0.010; Mg 0.7–1.1; Ti 0.01–0.07; Ni 0.02–0.10; Li 1.8–2.1; Zr 0.04–0.16; Be 0.02–0.20	Be-103 and Be-200 hydroplanes
1441K^{#}		Si 0.08; Fe 0.12; Cu 1.3–1.5; Mn 0.001–0.010; Mg 0.7–1.1; Ti 0.01–0.07; Ni 0.01–0.15; Li 1.8–2.1; Zr 0.04–0.16; Be 0.002–0.01	
1445^{#}		Si 0.08; Fe 0.12; Cu 1.3–1.5; Mn 0.001–0.010; Mg 0.7–1.1; Ti 0.01–0.1; Ni 0.01–0.15; Li 1.6–1.9; Zr 0.04–0.16; Be 0.002–0.01; Sc 0.005–0.001; Ag 0.05–0.15; Ca 0.005–0.04; Na 0.0015	
1450^{#}		Si 0.1; Fe 0.15; Cu 2.6–3.3; Mn 0.1; Mg 0.1; Cr 0.05; Zn 0.25; Ti 0.01–0.06; Li 1.8–2.3; Zr 0.08–0.14; Be 0.008–0.1; Na 0.002; Ce 0.005–0.05	An-124 and An-225 aircraft
1460^{#}		Si 0.1; Fe 0.03–0.15; Cu 2.6–3.3; Mg 0.05; Ti 0.01–0.05; Li 2.0–2.4; Zr 0.08–0.13; Na 0.002; Sc 0.05–0.14; B 0.0002–0.0003	Tu-156 aircraft
V-1461^{#}		Si 0.8; Fe 0.01–0.1; Cu 2.5–2.95; Mn 0.2–0.6; Mg 0.05–0.6; Cr 0.01–0.05; Zn 0.2–0.8; Ti 0.05; Ni 0.05–0.15; Li 1.5–1.95; Zr 0.05–0.12; Be 0.0001–0.02; Sc 0.05–0.10; Ca 0.001–0.05; Na 0.0015	
V-1464^{#}		Si 0.03–0.08; Fe 0.03–0.10; Cu 3.25–3.45; Mn 0.20–0.30; Mg 0.35–0.45; Ti 0.01–0.03; Li 1.55–1.70; Zr 0.08–0.10; Sc 0.08–0.10; Be 0.0003–0.02; Na 0.0005	
V-1469^{#}		Si 0.1; Fe 0.12; Cu 3.2–4.5; Mn 0.003–0.5; Mg 0.1–0.5; Li 1.0–1.5; Zr 0.04–0.20; Sc 0.04–0.15; Ag 0.15–0.6	

^{#} Not an International Alloy Designation System name

=== 2000 series (copper) ===
2000 series alloys are alloyed with copper and can be precipitation hardened to strengths comparable to steel. Formerly referred to as duralumin, they were once the most common aerospace alloys, but were susceptible to stress corrosion cracking and are increasingly replaced by 7000 series alloys in new designs.

2000 series aluminium alloy nominal composition (% weight) and applications
Alloy	Al contents	Alloying elements	Uses and refs
2004	93.6	Cu 6.0; Zr 0.4	Aerospace
2011	93.7	Cu 5.5; Bi 0.4; Pb 0.4	Universal
2014	93.5	Cu 4.4; Si 0.8; Mn 0.8; Mg 0.5	Universal
2017	94.2	Cu 4.0; Si 0.5; Mn 0.7; Mg 0.6	Aerospace
2020	93.4	Cu 4.5; Li 1.3; Mn 0.55; Cd 0.25	Aerospace
2024	93.5	Cu 4.4; Mn 0.6; Mg 1.5	Universal, aerospace
2029	94.6	Cu 3.6; Mn 0.3; Mg 1.0; Ag 0.4; Zr 0.1	Alclad sheet, aerospace
2036	96.7	Cu 2.6; Mn 0.25; Mg 0.45	Sheet
2048	94.8	Cu 3.3; Mn 0.4; Mg 1.5	Sheet, plate
2055	93.5	Cu 3.7; Zn 0.5; Li 1.1; Ag 0.4;Mn 0.2; Mg 0.3; Zr 0.1	Aerospace extrusions,
2080	94.0	Mg 3.7; Zn 1.85; Cr 0.2; Li 0.2	Aerospace
2090	95.0	Cu 2.7; Li 2.2; Zr 0.12	Aerospace
2091	94.3	Cu 2.1; Li 2.0; Mg 1.5; Zr 0.1	Aerospace, cryogenics
2094		Si 0.12; Fe 0.15; Cu 4.4–5.2; Mn 0.25; Mg 0.25–0.8; Zn 0.25; Ti 0.10; Ag 0.25–0.6; Li 0.7–1.4; Zr 0.04–0.18	
2095	93.6	Cu 4.2; Li 1.3; Mg 0.4; Ag 0.4; Zr 0.1	Aerospace
2097		Si 0.12; Fe 0.15; Cu 2.5–3.1; Mn 0.10–0.6; Mg 0.35; Zn 0.35; Ti 0.15; Li 1.2–1.8; Zr 0.08–0.15	
2098		Si 0.12; Fe 0.15; Cu 2.3–3.8; Mn 0.35; Mg 0.25–0.8; Zn 0.35; Ti 0.10; Ag 0.25–0.6; Li 2.4–2.8; Zr 0.04–0.18	
2099	94.3	Cu 2.53; Mn 0.3; Mg 0.25; Li 1.75; Zn 0.75; Zr 0.09	Aerospace
2124	93.5	Cu 4.4; Mn 0.6; Mg 1.5	Plate
2195	93.5	Cu 4.0; Mn 0.5; Mg 0.45; Li 1.0; Ag 0.4; Zr 0.12	Aerospace, Space Shuttle Super Lightweight external tank, and the SpaceX Falcon 9 and Falcon 1e second stage launch vehicles.
2196		Si 0.12; Fe 0.15; Cu 2.5–3.3; Mn 0.35; Mg 0.25–0.8; Zn 0.35; Ti 0.10; Ag 0.25–0.6; Li 1.4–2.1; Zr 0.08–0.16	Extrusion
2197		Si 0.10; Fe 0.10; Cu 2.5–3.1; Mn 0.10–0.50; Mg 0.25; Zn 0.05; Ti 0.12; Li 1.3–1.7; Zr 0.08–0.15	
2198			Sheet
2218	92.2	Cu 4.0; Mg 1.5; Fe 1.0; Si 0.9; Zn 0.25; Mn 0.2	Forgings, aircraft engine cylinders
2219	93.0	Cu 6.3; Mn 0.3;Ti 0.06; V 0.1; Zr 0.18	Universal, Space Shuttle Standard Weight external tank
2297		Si 0.10; Fe 0.10; Cu 2.5–3.1; Mn 0.10–0.50; Mg 0.25; Zn 0.05; Ti 0.12; Li 1.1–1.7; Zr 0.08–0.15	
2397		Si 0.10; Fe 0.10; Cu 2.5–3.1; Mn 0.10–0.50; Mg 0.25; Zn 0.05–0.15; Ti 0.12; Li 1.1–1.7; Zr 0.08–0.15	
2224&2324	93.8	Cu 4.1; Mn 0.6; Mg 1.5	Plate
2319	93.0	Cu 6.3; Mn 0.3; Ti 0.15; V 0.1; Zr 0.18	Bar and wire
2519	93.0	Cu 5.8; Mg 0.2; Ti 0.15; V 0.1; Zr 0.2	Aerospace armour plate
2524	93.8	Cu 4.2; Mn 0.6; Mg 1.4	Plate, sheet
2618	93.7	Cu 2.3; Si 0.18; Mg 1.6; Ti 0.07; Fe 1.1; Ni 1.0	Forgings

=== 3000 series (manganese) ===
3000 series alloys are alloyed with manganese, and can be work hardened.

3000 series aluminium alloy nominal composition (% weight) and applications
Alloy	Al contents	Alloying elements	Uses and refs
3003	98.6	Mn 1.5; Cu 0.12	Universal, sheet, rigid foil containers, signs, decorative
3004	97.8	Mn 1.2; Mg 1	Universal, beverage cans
3005	98.5	Mn 1.0; Mg 0.5	Work-hardened
3102	99.8	Mn 0.2	Work-hardened
3103&3303	98.8	Mn 1.2	Work-hardened
3105	97.8	Mn 0.55; Mg 0.5	Sheet
3203	98.8	Mn 1.2	Sheet, high-strength foil

=== 4000 series (silicon) ===
4000 series alloys are alloyed with silicon. Variations of aluminium–silicon alloys intended for casting (and therefore not included in 4000 series) are also known as silumin.

4000 series aluminium alloy nominal composition (% weight) and applications
Alloy	Al contents	Alloying elements	Uses and refs
4006	98.3	Si 1.0; Fe 0.65	Work-hardened or aged
4007	96.3	Si 1.4; Mn 1.2; Fe 0.7; Ni 0.3; Cr 0.1	Work-hardened
4015	96.8	Si 2.0; Mn 1.0; Mg 0.2	Work-hardened
4032	85	Si 12.2; Cu 0.9; Mg 1; Ni 0.9;	Forgings
4043	94.8	Si 5.2	Rod, welding filler, brazing filler
4047	85.5	Si 12.0; Fe 0.8; Cu 0.3; Zn 0.2; Mn 0.15; Mg 0.1	Sheet, cladding, fillers
4543	93.7	Si 6.0; Mg 0.3	Architectural extrusions
4643	93.7	Si 4.1; Fe 0.8; Mg 0.2; Zn 0.1	Welding filler for 6000 series

=== 5000 series (magnesium) ===
5000 series alloys are alloyed with magnesium, and offer superb corrosion resistance, making them suitable for marine applications. 5083 alloy has the highest strength of non-heat-treated alloys. Most 5000 series alloys include manganese as well.

5000 series aluminium alloy nominal composition (% weight) and applications
Alloy	Al contents	Alloying elements	Uses and refs
5005 & 5657	99.2	Mg 0.8	Sheet, plate, rod
5010	99.3	Mg 0.5; Mn 0.2;	
5019	94.7	Mg 5.0; Mn 0.25;	
5024	94.5	Mg 4.6; Mn 0.6; Zr 0.1; Sc 0.2	Extrusions, aerospace
5026	93.9	Mg 4.5; Mn 1; Si 0.9; Fe 0.4; Cu 0.3	
5050	98.6	Mg 1.4	Universal
5052 & 5652	97.2	Mg 2.5; Cr 0.25	Universal, aerospace, marine
5056	94.8	Mg 5.0; Mn 0.12; Cr 0.12	Foil, rod, rivets
5059	93.5	Mg 5.0; Mn 0.8; Zn 0.6; Zr 0.12	Rocket cryogenic tanks
5083	94.8	Mg 4.4; Mn 0.7; Cr 0.15	Universal, welding, marine
5086	95.4	Mg 4.0; Mn 0.4; Cr 0.15	Universal, welding, marine
5154 & 5254	96.2	Mg 3.5; Cr 0.25;	Universal, rivets
5182	95.2	Mg 4.5; Mn 0.35;	Sheet
5252	97.5	Mg 2.5;	Sheet
5356	94.6	Mg 5.0; Mn 0.12; Cr 0.12; Ti 0.13	Rod, MIG wire
5454	96.4	Mg 2.7; Mn 0.8; Cr 0.12	Universal
5456	94	Mg 5.1; Mn 0.8; Cr 0.12	Universal
5457	98.7	Mg 1.0; Mn 0.2; Cu 0.1	Sheet, automobile trim
5557	99.1	Mg 0.6; Mn 0.2; Cu 0.1	Sheet, automobile trim
5754	95.8	Mg 3.1; Mn 0.5; Cr 0.3	Sheet, rod

=== 6000 series (magnesium and silicon) ===
6000 series alloys are alloyed with magnesium and silicon. They are easy to machine, are weldable, and can be precipitation hardened, but not to the high strengths that 2000 and 7000 can reach. 6061 alloy is one of the most commonly used general-purpose aluminium alloys.

6000 series aluminium alloy nominal composition (% weight) and applications
Alloy	Al contents	Alloying elements	Uses and refs
6005	98.7	Si 0.8; Mg 0.5	Extrusions, angles
6005A	96.5	Si 0.6; Mg 0.5; Cu 0.3; Cr 0.3; Fe 0.35	
6009	97.7	Si 0.8; Mg 0.6; Mn 0.5; Cu 0.35	Sheet
6010	97.3	Si 1.0; Mg 0.7; Mn 0.5; Cu 0.35	Sheet
6013	97.05	Si 0.8; Mg 1.0; Mn 0.35; Cu 0.8	Plate, aerospace, smartphone cases
6022	97.9	Si 1.1; Mg 0.6; Mn 0.05; Cu 0.05; Fe 0.3	Sheet, automotive
6060	98.9	Si 0.4; Mg 0.5; Fe 0.2	Heat-treatable
6061	97.9	Si 0.6; Mg 1.0; Cu 0.25; Cr 0.2	Universal, structural, aerospace
6063 & 646g	98.9	Si 0.4; Mg 0.7	Universal, marine, decorative
6063A	98.7	Si 0.4; Mg 0.7; Fe 0.2	Heat-treatable
6065	97.1	Si 0.6; Mg 1.0; Cu 0.25; Bi 1.0	Heat-treatable
6066	95.7	Si 1.4; Mg 1.1; Mn 0.8; Cu 1.0	Universal
6070	96.8	Si 1.4; Mg 0.8; Mn 0.7; Cu 0.28	Extrusions
6081	98.1	Si 0.9; Mg 0.8; Mn 0.2	Heat-treatable
6082	97.5	Si 1.0; Mg 0.85; Mn 0.65	Heat-treatable
6101	98.9	Si 0.5; Mg 0.6	Extrusions
6105	98.6	Si 0.8; Mg 0.65	Heat-treatable
6111	98.4	Cu 0.7; Mg 0.75; Si 0.85	Precipitation hardening; used for automotive paneling. Corrosion resistance.
6113	96.8	Si 0.8; Mg 1.0; Mn 0.35; Cu 0.8; O 0.2	Aerospace
6151	98.2	Si 0.9; Mg 0.6; Cr 0.25	Forgings
6162	98.6	Si 0.55; Mg 0.9	Heat-treatable
6201	98.5	Si 0.7; Mg 0.8	Rod
6205	98.4	Si 0.8; Mg 0.5;Mn 0.1; Cr 0.1; Zr 0.1	Extrusions
6262	96.8	Si 0.6; Mg 1.0; Cu 0.25; Cr 0.1; Bi 0.6; Pb 0.6	Universal
6351	97.8	Si 1.0; Mg 0.6;Mn 0.6	Extrusions
6463	98.9	Si 0.4; Mg 0.7	Extrusions
6951	97.2	Si 0.5; Fe 0.8; Cu 0.3; Mg 0.7; Mn 0.1; Zn 0.2	Heat-treatable

=== 7000 series (zinc) ===
7000 series alloys are alloyed with zinc, and can be precipitation hardened to the highest strengths of any aluminium alloy. Most 7000 series alloys include magnesium and copper as well.

7000 series aluminium alloy nominal composition (% weight) and applications
Alloy	Al contents	Alloying elements	Uses and refs
7005	93.3	Zn 4.5; Mg 1.4; Mn 0.45; Cr 0.13; Zr 0.14; Ti 0.04	Extrusions
7010	93.3	Zn 6.2; Mg 2.35; Cu 1.7; Zr 0.1;	Aerospace
7022	91.1	Zn 4.7; Mg 3.1; Mn 0.2; Cu 0.7; Cr 0.2;	Plate, molds
7034	85.7	Zn 11.0; Mg 2.3; Cu 1.0	Ultimate tensile strength 750 MPa
7039	92.3	Zn 4.0; Mg 3.3; Mn 0.2; Cr 0.2	Aerospace armour plate
7049	88.1	Zn 7.7; Mg 2.45; Cu 1.6; Cr 0.15	Universal, aerospace
7050	89.0	Zn 6.2; Mg 2.3; Cu 2.3; Zr 0.1	Universal, aerospace
7055	87.2	Zn 8.0; Mg 2.3; Cu 2.3; Zr 0.1	Plate, extrusions, aerospace
7065	88.5	Zn 7.7; Mg 1.6; Cu 2.1; Zr 0.1	Plate, aerospace
7068	87.6	Zn 7.8; Mg 2.5; Cu 2.0; Zr 0.12	Aerospace. Ultimate tensile strength 710 MPa
7072	99.0	Zn 1.0	Sheet, foil
7075 & 7175	90.0	Zn 5.6; Mg 2.5; Cu 1.6; Cr 0.23	Universal, aerospace, forgings
7079	91.4	Zn 4.3; Mg 3.3; Cu 0.6; Mn 0.2; Cr 0.15	-
7085	89.4	Zn 7.5; Mg 1.5; Cu 1.6	Thick plate, aerospace
7090		Al-Zn-Mg-Cu with Co 1.5%	High strength, ductility and resistance to stress corrosion cracking
7091		Al-Zn-Mg-Cu with Co 0.4%	High strength, ductility and resistance to stress corrosion cracking
7093	86.7	Zn 9.0; Mg 2.5; Cu 1.5; O 0.2; Zr 0.1	Aerospace
7116	93.7	Zn 4.5; Mg 1; Cu 0.8	Heat-treatable
7129	93.2	Zn 4.5; Mg 1.6; Cu 0.7	-
7150	89.05	Zn 6.4; Mg 2.35; Cu 2.2; O 0.2; Zr 0.1	Aerospace
7178	88.1	Zn 6.8; Mg 2.7; Cu 2.0; Cr 0.26	Universal, aerospace
7255	87.5	Zn 8.0; Mg 2.1; Cu 2.3; Zr 0.1	Plate, aerospace
7475	90.3	Zn 5.7; Mg 2.3; Si 1.5; Cr 0.22	Universal, aerospace

=== 8000 series (other elements) ===
8000 series alloys are alloyed with other elements which are not covered by other series. Aluminium–lithium alloys are an example.

8000 series aluminium alloy nominal composition (% weight) and applications
Alloy	Al content	Alloying elements	Uses and refs
8006	98.0	Fe 1.5; Mn 0.5;	Universal, weldable
8009	88.3	Fe 8.6; Si 1.8; V 1.3	High-temperature aerospace
8011	98.7	Fe 0.7; Si 0.6	Work-hardened
8014	98.2	Fe 1.4; Mn 0.4;	Universal
8019	87.5	Fe 8.3; Ce 4.0; O 0.2	Aerospace
8025		Si 0.05; Fe 0.06–0.25; Cu 0.20; Mg 0.05; Cr 0.18; Zn 0.50; Ti 0.005–0.02; Li 3.4–4.2; Zr 0.08–0.25	
8030	99.3	Fe 0.5; Cu 0.2	Wire
8090		Si 0.20; Fe 0.30; Cu 1.0–1.6; Mn 0.10; Mg 0.6–1.3; Cr 0.10; Zn 0.25; Ti 0.10; Li 2.2–2.7; Zr 0.04–0.16	
8091		Si 0.30; Fe 0.50; Cu 1.0–1.6; Mn 0.10; Mg 0.50–1.2; Cr 0.10; Zn 0.25; Ti 0.10; Li 2.4–2.8; Zr 0.08–0.16	
8093		Si 0.10; Fe 0.10; Cu 1.6–2.2; Mn 0.10; Mg 0.9–1.6; Cr 0.10; Zn 0.25; Ti 0.10; Li 1.9–2.6; Zr 0.04–0.14	
8176	99.3	Fe 0.6; Si 0.1	Electrical wire

=== Mixed list ===
Wrought aluminium alloy composition limits (% weight)
Alloy	Si	Fe	Cu	Mn	Mg	Cr	Zn	V	Ti	Bi	Ga	Pb	Zr	Limits^{††}		Al
Alloy	Si	Fe	Cu	Mn	Mg	Cr	Zn	V	Ti	Bi	Ga	Pb	Zr	Each	Total	Al
1050	0.25	0.40	0.05	0.05	0.05			0.05						0.03		99.5 min
1060	0.25	0.35	0.05	0.028	0.03	0.03	0.05	0.05	0.028	0.03	0.03	0.03	0.03	0.028		99.6 min
1100	0.95 Si+Fe		0.05–0.20	0.05			0.10							0.05	0.15	99.0 min
1199	0.006	0.006	0.006	0.002	0.006		0.006	0.005	0.002		0.005			0.002		99.99 min
2014	0.50–1.2	0.7	3.9–5.0	0.40–1.2	0.20–0.8	0.10	0.25		0.15					0.05	0.15	remainder
2024	0.50	0.50	3.8–4.9	0.30–0.9	1.2–1.8	0.10	0.25		0.15					0.05	0.15	remainder
2219	0.2	0.30	5.8–6.8	0.20–0.40	0.02		0.10	0.05–0.15	0.02–0.10				0.10–0.25	0.05	0.15	remainder
3003	0.6	0.7	0.05–0.20	1.0–1.5			0.10							0.05	0.15	remainder
3004	0.30	0.7	0.25	1.0–1.5	0.8–1.3		0.25							0.05	0.15	remainder
3102	0.40	0.7	0.10	0.05–0.40			0.30		0.10					0.05	0.15	remainder
4043	4.5–6.0	0.80	0.30	0.05	0.05		0.10		0.20					0.05	0.15	remainder
5005	0.3	0.7	0.2	0.2	0.5–1.1	0.1	0.25							0.05	0.15	remainder
5052	0.25	0.40	0.10	0.10	2.2–2.8	0.15–0.35	0.10							0.05	0.15	remainder
5083	0.40	0.40	0.10	0.40–1.0	4.0–4.9	0.05–0.25	0.25		0.15					0.05	0.15	remainder
5086	0.40	0.50	0.10	0.20–0.7	3.5–4.5	0.05–0.25	0.25		0.15					0.05	0.15	remainder
5154	0.25	0.40	0.10	0.10	3.10–3.90	0.15–0.35	0.20		0.20					0.05	0.15	remainder
5356	0.25	0.40	0.10	0.10	4.50–5.50	0.05–0.20	0.10		0.06–0.20					0.05	0.15	remainder
5454	0.25	0.40	0.10	0.50–1.0	2.4–3.0	0.05–0.20	0.25		0.20					0.05	0.15	remainder
5456	0.25	0.40	0.10	0.50–1.0	4.7–5.5	0.05–0.20	0.25		0.20					0.05	0.15	remainder
5754	0.40	0.40	0.10	0.50	2.6–3.6	0.30	0.20		0.15					0.05	0.15	remainder
6005	0.6–0.9	0.35	0.10	0.10	0.40–0.6	0.10	0.10		0.10					0.05	0.15	remainder
6005A^{†}	0.50–0.9	0.35	0.30	0.50	0.40–0.7	0.30	0.20		0.10					0.05	0.15	remainder
6060	0.30–0.6	0.10–0.30	0.10	0.10	0.35–0.6	0.05	0.15		0.10					0.05	0.15	remainder
6061	0.40–0.8	0.7	0.15–0.40	0.15	0.8–1.2	0.04–0.35	0.25		0.15					0.05	0.15	remainder
6063	0.20–0.6	0.35	0.10	0.10	0.45–0.9	0.10	0.10		0.10					0.05	0.15	remainder
6066	0.9–1.8	0.50	0.7–1.2	0.6–1.1	0.8–1.4	0.40	0.25		0.20					0.05	0.15	remainder
6070	1.0–1.7	0.50	0.15–0.40	0.40–1.0	0.50–1.2	0.10	0.25		0.15					0.05	0.15	remainder
6082	0.7–1.3	0.50	0.10	0.40–1.0	0.60–1.2	0.25	0.20		0.10					0.05	0.15	remainder
6105	0.6–1.0	0.35	0.10	0.10	0.45–0.8	0.10	0.10		0.10					0.05	0.15	remainder
6162	0.40–0.8	0.50	0.20	0.10	0.7–1.1	0.10	0.25		0.10					0.05	0.15	remainder
6262	0.40–0.8	0.7	0.15–0.40	0.15	0.8–1.2	0.04–0.14	0.25		0.15	0.40–0.7		0.40–0.7		0.05	0.15	remainder
6351	0.7–1.3	0.50	0.10	0.40–0.8	0.40–0.8		0.20		0.20					0.05	0.15	remainder
6463	0.20–0.6	0.15	0.20	0.05	0.45–0.9		0.05							0.05	0.15	remainder
7005	0.35	0.40	0.10	0.20–0.70	1.0–1.8	0.06–0.20	4.0–5.0		0.01–0.06				0.08–0.20	0.05	0.15	remainder
7022	0.50	0.50	0.50–1.00	0.10–0.40	2.60–3.70	0.10–0.30	4.30–5.20		0.20					0.05	0.15	remainder
7068	0.12	0.15	1.60–2.40	0.10	2.20–3.00	0.05	7.30–8.30		0.01				0.05–0.15	0.05	0.15	remainder
7072	0.7 Si+Fe		0.10	0.10	0.10		0.8–1.3							0.05	0.15	remainder
7075	0.40	0.50	1.2–2.0	0.30	2.1–2.9	0.18–0.28	5.1–6.1		0.20					0.05	0.15	remainder
7079	0.3	0.40	0.40–0.80	0.10–0.30	2.9–3.7	0.10–0.25	3.8–4.8		0.10					0.05	0.15	remainder
7116	0.15	0.30	0.50–1.1	0.05	0.8–1.4		4.2–5.2	0.05	0.05		0.03			0.05	0.15	remainder
7129	0.15	0.30	0.50–0.9	0.10	1.3–2.0	0.10	4.2–5.2	0.05	0.05		0.03			0.05	0.15	remainder
7178	0.40	0.50	1.6–2.4	0.30	2.4–3.1	0.18–0.28	6.3–7.3		0.20					0.05	0.15	remainder
8176	0.03–0.15	0.40–1.0					0.10				0.03			0.05	0.15	remainder
Alloy	Si	Fe	Cu	Mn	Mg	Cr	Zn	V	Ti	Bi	Ga	Pb	Zr	Limits^{††}		Al
Alloy	Si	Fe	Cu	Mn	Mg	Cr	Zn	V	Ti	Bi	Ga	Pb	Zr	Each	Total	Al
^{†}Manganese plus chromium must be between 0.12 and 0.50%.^{††}This limit applies to all elements for which no other limit is specified on a given row, because no column exists or because the column is blank.

== Cast alloys ==
The Aluminum Association (AA) has adopted a nomenclature similar to that of wrought alloys. British Standard and DIN have different designations. In the AA system, the second two digits reveal the minimum percentage of aluminium; for example, 150.x corresponds to a minimum of 99.50% aluminium. The digit after the decimal point takes a value of 0 or 1, denoting casting and ingot respectively. The main alloying elements in the AA system are as follows:

- 1xx.x series are minimum 99% aluminium
- 2xx.x series copper
- 3xx.x series silicon, with added copper and/or magnesium
- 4xx.x series silicon
- 5xx.x series magnesium
- 6xx.x unused series
- 7xx.x series zinc
- 8xx.x series tin
- 9xx.x other elements

Minimum tensile requirements for cast aluminium alloys
Alloy type		Temper	Tensile strength (min) in ksi (MPa)	Yield strength (min) in ksi (MPa)	Elongation in 2 in %
ANSI	UNS	Temper	Tensile strength (min) in ksi (MPa)	Yield strength (min) in ksi (MPa)	Elongation in 2 in %
201.0	A02010	T7	60.0 (414)	50.0 (345)	3.0
204.0	A02040	T4	45.0 (310)	28.0 (193)	6.0
242.0	A02420	O	23.0 (159)	N/A	N/A
242.0	A02420	T61	32.0 (221)	20.0 (138)	N/A
A242.0	A12420	T75	29.0 (200)	N/A	1.0
295.0	A02950	T4	29.0 (200)	13.0 (90)	6.0
295.0	A02950	T6	32.0 (221)	20.0 (138)	3.0
295.0	A02950	T62	36.0 (248)	28.0 (193)	N/A
295.0	A02950	T7	29.0 (200)	16.0 (110)	3.0
319.0	A03190	F	23.0 (159)	13.0 (90)	1.5
319.0	A03190	T5	25.0 (172)	N/A	N/A
319.0	A03190	T6	31.0 (214)	20.0 (138)	1.5
328.0	A03280	F	25.0 (172)	14.0 (97)	1.0
328.0	A03280	T6	34.0 (234)	21.0 (145)	1.0
355.0	A03550	T6	32.0 (221)	20.0 (138)	2.0
355.0	A03550	T51	25.0 (172)	18.0 (124)	N/A
355.0	A03550	T71	30.0 (207)	22.0 (152)	N/A
C355.0	A33550	T6	36.0 (248)	25.0 (172)	2.5
356.0	A03560	F	19.0 (131)	9.5 (66)	2.0
356.0	A03560	T6	30.0 (207)	20.0 (138)	3.0
356.0	A03560	T7	31.0 (214)	N/A	N/A
356.0	A03560	T51	23.0 (159)	16.0 (110)	N/A
356.0	A03560	T71	25.0 (172)	18.0 (124)	3.0
A356.0	A13560	T6	34.0 (234)	24.0 (165)	3.5
A356.0	A13560	T61	35.0 (241)	26.0 (179)	1.0
443.0	A04430	F	17.0 (117)	7.0 (48)	3.0
B443.0	A24430	F	17.0 (117)	6.0 (41)	3.0
512.0	A05120	F	17.0 (117)	10.0 (69)	N/A
514.0	A05140	F	22.0 (152)	9.0 (62)	6.0
520.0	A05200	T4	42.0 (290)	22.0 (152)	12.0
535.0	A05350	F	35.0 (241)	18.0 (124)	9.0
705.0	A07050	T5	30.0 (207)	17.0 (117)^{†}	5.0
707.0	A07070	T7	37.0 (255)	30.0 (207)^{†}	1.0
710.0	A07100	T5	32.0 (221)	20.0 (138)	2.0
712.0	A07120	T5	34.0 (234)	25.0 (172)^{†}	4.0
713.0	A07130	T5	32.0 (221)	22.0 (152)	3.0
771.0	A07710	T5	42.0 (290)	38.0 (262)	1.5
771.0	A07710	T51	32.0 (221)	27.0 (186)	3.0
771.0	A07710	T52	36.0 (248)	30.0 (207)	1.5
771.0	A07710	T6	42.0 (290)	35.0 (241)	5.0
771.0	A07710	T71	48.0 (331)	45.0 (310)	5.0
850.0	A08500	T5	16.0 (110)	N/A	5.0
851.0	A08510	T5	17.0 (117)	N/A	3.0
852.0	A08520	T5	24.0 (165)	18.0 (124)	N/A
^{†}Only when requested by the customer

=== Named alloys ===
- A380 offers an excellent combination of casting, mechanical, and thermal properties, and exhibits excellent fluidity, pressure tightness, and resistance to hot cracking. Used in the aerospace industry.
- Alferium is an aluminium–iron alloy developed by Schneider, used for aircraft manufacture by Société pour la Construction d'Avions Métallique "Aviméta".
- Alclad is aluminium sheet formed from high-purity aluminium surface layers bonded to high-strength aluminium alloy core material.
- Aludur is an age-hardening aluminium alloy produced by the Giulini Werke in the early twentieth century, It contained approximately 0.7% silicon, 0.5% magnesium, and 0.5% iron.
- Birmabright (aluminium, magnesium) is a product of The Birmetals Company, basically equivalent to 5251.
- Duralumin (copper, aluminium)
- Hindalium (aluminium, magnesium, manganese, silicon) is a product of Hindustan Aluminium Corporation Ltd, made in 16ga rolled sheets for cookware.
- Lockalloy is an alloy that consists of 62% beryllium and 38% aluminium. It was used as a structural metal in the aerospace industry, developed in the 1960s by the Lockheed Missiles and Space Company.
- Pandalloy is a Pratt & Whitney proprietary alloy, supposedly having high strength and superior high temperature performance.
- Magnalium
- Magnox (magnesium, aluminium)
- Silumin (aluminium, silicon)
- Titanal (aluminium, zinc, magnesium, copper, zirconium) is a product of AMAG Austria Metall AG. It is commonly used in high performance sports products, particularly snowboards and skis.
- Y alloy; Hiduminium alloys, also known as R.R. alloys: pre-war nickel–aluminium alloys, used in aerospace and engine pistons, for their ability to retain strength at elevated temperature. These are replaced nowadays by higher-performing iron-aluminium alloys like 8009 capable of operating with low creep up to 300 °C.

== Applications ==
=== Aerospace alloys ===
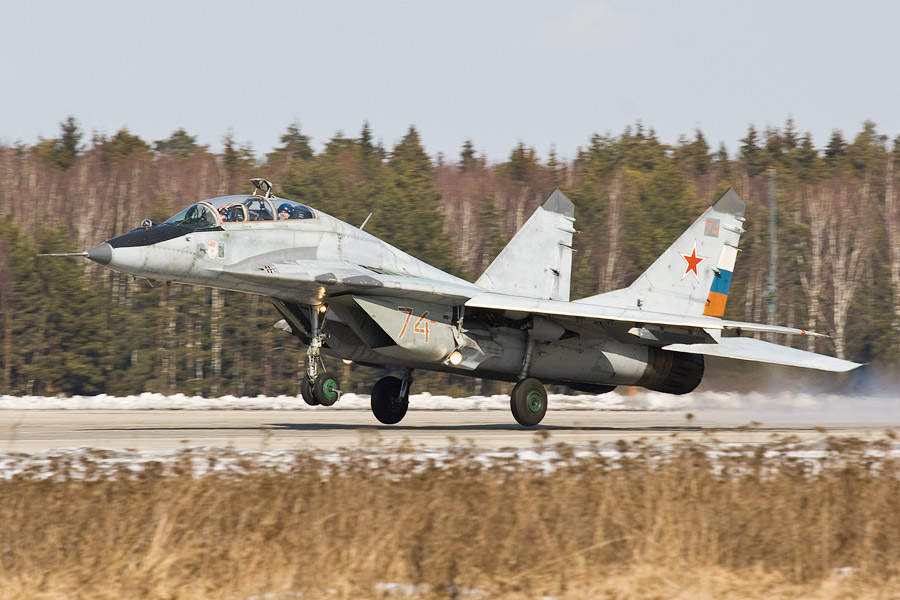
Parts of the MiG–29 are made from Al–Sc alloy

Titanium alloys, which are stronger but heavier than Al-Sc alloys, are still much more widely used.

The main application of metallic scandium by weight is in aluminium–scandium alloys for minor aerospace industry components. These alloys contain between 0.1% and 0.5% (by weight) of scandium. They were used in the Russian military aircraft MiG-21 and MiG-29.

Some items of sports equipment, which rely on high-performance materials, have been made with scandium–aluminium alloys, including baseball bats, lacrosse sticks, bicycle frames and components, and tent poles.

U.S. gunmaker Smith & Wesson produces revolvers with frames composed of scandium alloy and cylinders of titanium.

==== Potential use as space materials ====
Due to its light weight and high strength, aluminium alloys are desired materials to be applied in spacecraft, satellites, and other components to be deployed in space. However, this application is limited by the energetic particle irradiation emitted by the Sun. The impact and deposition of solar energetic particles within the microstructure of conventional aluminium alloys can induce the dissolution of most common hardening phases, leading to softening. The recently introduced crossover aluminium alloys are being tested as surrogates to 6xxx and 7xxx series alloys in environments where energetic particle irradiation is a major concern. Such crossover aluminium alloys can be hardened via precipitation of a chemical complex phase known as T-phase in which the radiation resistance has been proved to be superior than other hardening phases of conventional aluminium alloys.

==== List of aerospace aluminium alloys ====
The following aluminium alloys are commonly used in aircraft and other aerospace structures:

- 1420
- 2004; 2014; 2017; 2020; 2024; 2080; 2090; 2091; 2095; 2219; 2224; 2324; 2519; 2524
- 4047
- 6013; 6061; 6063; 6113; 6951
- 7010; 7049; 7050; 7055; 7068; 7075; 7079; 7093; 7150; 7178; 7475
- 8009

The terms aircraft aluminium or aerospace aluminium usually refers to 7075.

4047 aluminium is a unique alloy used in aerospace and automotive applications as a cladding alloy or filler material. As filler, aluminium alloy 4047 strips can be combined to intricate applications to bond two metals.

6951 is a heat-treatable alloy providing additional strength to the fins while increasing sag resistance; this allows the manufacturer to reduce the gauge of the sheet and therefore reducing the weight of the formed fin. These distinctive features make aluminium alloy 6951 one of the preferred alloys for heat transfer and heat exchangers manufactured for aerospace applications.

6063 aluminium alloys are heat-treatable with moderately high strength, excellent corrosion resistance, and good extrudability. They are regularly used as architectural and structural members.

The following list of aluminium alloys are currently produced, but less widely used:

- 2090 aluminium
- 2124 aluminium
- 2324 aluminium
- 6013 aluminium
- 7050 aluminium
- 7055 aluminium
- 7150 aluminium
- 7475 aluminium

=== Marine alloys ===
These alloys are used for boat building and shipbuilding, and other marine and salt-water sensitive shore applications.

- 5052 aluminium alloy
- 5059 aluminium alloy
- 5083 aluminium alloy
- 5086 aluminium alloy
- 6061 aluminium alloy
- 6063 aluminium alloy

4043, 5183, 6005A, and 6082 also used in marine constructions and off shore applications.

=== Automotive alloys ===
6111 aluminium and 2008 aluminium are extensively used for external automotive body panels, with 5083 and 5754 used for inner body panels. Bonnets have been manufactured from 2036, 6016, and 6111 alloys. Truck and trailer body panels have used 5456 aluminium.

Automobile frames often use 5182 aluminium or 5754 aluminium formed sheets, 6061 or 6063 extrusions.

Wheels have been cast from A356.0 aluminium or formed 5xxx sheet.

Engine blocks and crankcases are often cast from aluminium alloys. The most popular aluminium alloys used for cylinder blocks are A356, 319, and to a minor extent 242.

Aluminium alloys containing cerium are being developed and implemented in high-temperature automotive applications, such as cylinder heads and turbochargers, and in other energy-generation applications. These alloys were initially developed as a way to increase the usage of cerium, which is over-produced in rare-earth mining operations for more coveted elements such as neodymium and dysprosium, but gained attention for their strength at high temperatures over long periods of time. They gain strength from the presence of an Al_{11}Ce_{3} intermetallic phase which is stable up to temperatures of 540 °C, and retains its strength up to 300 °C, making it quite viable at elevated temperatures. Aluminium–cerium alloys are typically cast, due to their excellent casting properties, although work has also been done to show that laser-based additive manufacturing techniques can be used as well to create parts with more complex geometries and greater mechanical properties. Recent work has largely focused on adding higher-order alloying elements to the binary Al-Ce system to improve its mechanical performance at room and elevated temperatures, such as iron, nickel, magnesium, or copper, and work is being done to understand the alloying element interactions further.

=== Air and gas cylinders ===
6061 aluminium and 6351 aluminium are widely used in breathing gas cylinders for scuba diving and SCBA alloys.

== See also ==
- 7072 aluminium alloy
- 7116 aluminium alloy

== Bibliography ==
- Grushko, Olga; Ovsyannikov, Boris; Ovchinnokov, Viktor (2016). Eskin, D. G. (ed.). Aluminum-Lithium Alloys: Process Metallurgy, Physical Metallurgy, and Welding. Advances in metallic alloys. Vol. 8. CRC Press/Taylor & Francis Group. doi:10.1201/9781315369525. ISBN 978-1-4987-3717-3. OCLC 943678703.
- Baykov Dmitry et al. Weldable aluminium alloys (in Russian); Leningrad, Sudpromgiz, 1959, 236 p.
