= Aluminium–zinc alloys =

Aluminium brass is a technically rather uncommon term for high-strength and partly seawater-resistant copper-zinc cast and wrought alloys with 55–66% copper, up to 7% aluminium, up to 4.5% iron, and 5% manganese. Aluminium bronze is technically correct as bronze, a zinc-free copper-tin casting alloy with aluminium content.

The term "special brass" is much more common for this, which then also includes alloys that add further characteristic elements to the copper-zinc base. In addition to the already mentioned elements of iron and manganese, lead, nickel and silicon can also be found as alloy components.

Due to their aluminium content, which is susceptible to oxidation at the usual melting temperatures in the range of 900 °C, the alloys require careful melting and melting treatment. Even when potting, attention must be paid to any oxides forming.

== 7000 series ==
7000 series are alloyed with zinc, and can be precipitation hardened to the highest strengths of any aluminium alloy. Most 7000 series alloys include magnesium and copper as well.

7000 series aluminium alloy nominal composition (% weight) and applications
Alloy	Al contents	Alloying elements	Uses and refs
7005	93.3	Zn 4.5; Mg 1.4; Mn 0.45; Cr 0.13; Zr 0.14; Ti 0.04	Extrusions
7010	93.3	Zn 6.2; Mg 2.35; Cu 1.7; Zr 0.1;	Aerospace
7022	91.1	Zn 4.7; Mg 3.1; Mn 0.2; Cu 0.7; Cr 0.2;	plate, molds
7034	85.7	Zn 11.0; Mg 2.3; Cu 1.0	Ultimate tensile strength 750 MPa
7039	92.3	Zn 4.0; Mg 3.3; Mn 0.2; Cr 0.2	Aerospace armour plate
7049	88.1	Zn 7.7; Mg 2.45; Cu 1.6; Cr 0.15	Universal, aerospace
7050	89.0	Zn 6.2; Mg 2.3; Cu 2.3; Zr 0.1	Universal, aerospace
7055	87.2	Zn 8.0; Mg 2.3; Cu 2.3; Zr 0.1	Plate, extrusions, aerospace
7065	88.5	Zn 7.7; Mg 1.6; Cu 2.1; Zr 0.1	Plate, aerospace
7068	87.6	Zn 7.8; Mg 2.5; Cu 2.0; Zr 0.12	Aerospace, Ultimate tensile strength 710 MPa
7072	99.0	Zn 1.0	Sheet, foil
7075 & 7175	90.0	Zn 5.6; Mg 2.5; Cu 1.6; Cr 0.23	Universal, aerospace, forgings
7079	91.4	Zn 4.3; Mg 3.3; Cu 0.6; Mn 0.2; Cr 0.15	–
7085	89.4	Zn 7.5; Mg 1.5; Cu 1.6	Thick plate, aerospace
7090		Al-Zn-Mg-Cu with Co 1.5%	high strength, ductility and resistance to stress corrosion cracking
7091		Al-Zn-Mg-Cu with Co 0.4%	high strength, ductility and resistance to stress corrosion cracking
7093	86.7	Zn 9.0; Mg 2.5; Cu 1.5; O 0.2; Zr 0.1	Aerospace
7116	93.7	Zn 4.5; Mg 1; Cu 0.8	Heat-treatable
7129	93.2	Zn 4.5; Mg 1.6; Cu 0.7	–
7150	89.05	Zn 6.4; Mg 2.35; Cu 2.2; O 0.2; Zr 0.1	Aerospace
7178	88.1	Zn 6.8; Mg 2.7; Cu 2.0; Cr 0.26	Universal, aerospace
7255	87.5	Zn 8.0; Mg 2.1; Cu 2.3; Zr 0.1	Plate, aerospace
7475	90.3	Zn 5.7; Mg 2.3; Si 1.5; Cr 0.22	Universal, aerospace
