= 2519 aluminium alloy =

Aluminium copper alloy

AA 2519 is an aluminium alloy principally containing copper (5.3–6.4%) as an alloying element. It also contains 0.25% silicon, 0.30% iron, 0.10–0.50% manganese, 0.05–0.40% magnesium, 0.10% zinc, 0.02–0.10% titanium, 0.05–0.15% vanadium, 0.10–0.25% zirconium, 0.40% silicon-iron compounds, and up to 0.15% trace elements. The density of 2519 aluminium is 2820 kg/m^{3}. It was first registered in 1985, in the United States.

One application for this alloy is in aircraft armor, where it has equivalent ballistic characteristics to AA 7039, and a reduced susceptibility to stress corrosion cracking as compared to AA 5083.

AA 2519-T87 plate is weldable using AA 2319 filler.
