= 2219 aluminium alloy =

Wrought aluminium-copper alloy

A2219

Physical properties
- Density (ρ): 2.84 g/cm^{3}

Mechanical properties
- Young's modulus (E): 73.8 GPa (10,700 ksi)
- Tensile strength (σ_{t}): 172–476 MPa (24.9–69.0 ksi)
- Elongation (ε) at break: 3-14%
- Poisson's ratio (ν): 0.33

Thermal properties
- Melting temperature (T_{m}): 543 °C (1,009 °F)
- Thermal conductivity (k): 116-170 W/m*K
- Linear thermal expansion coefficient (α): 2.25*10^{−5} K^{−1}
- Specific heat capacity (c): 864 J/kg*K

Electrical properties
- Volume resistivity (ρ): 39-62 nOhm*m

2219 aluminium alloy is an alloy in the wrought aluminium-copper family (2000 or 2xxx series). It can be heat-treated to produce tempers with higher strength but lower ductility. The aluminium-copper alloys have high strength, but are generally less corrosion resistant and harder to weld than other types of aluminium alloys. To compensate for the lower corrosion resistance, 2219 aluminium can be clad in a commercially pure alloy such as 1050 or painted. This alloy is commonly formed by both extrusion and forging, but is not used in casting.

The 2219 aluminium alloy in particular has high fracture toughness, is weldable and resistant to stress corrosion cracking, therefore it is widely used in supersonic aircraft skin and structural members. The Space Shuttle Standard Weight Tank was also fabricated from the 2219 alloy. The Columbus module on the International Space Station also used 2219 aluminium alloy with a cylinder thickness of 4 mm, which was increased to 7 mm for the end cones. The dome and skirt of the Cupola Module on the International Space Station also use 2219 aluminium alloy.

Alternate designations include AlCu6Mn and A92219. It is described in the following standards:

- ASTM B 209: Standard Specification for Aluminium and Aluminium-Alloy Sheet and Plate
- ASTM B 211: Standard Specification for Aluminium and Aluminium-Alloy Bar, Rod, and Wire
- ASTM B 221: Standard Specification for Aluminium and Aluminium-Alloy Extruded Bars, Rods, Wire, Profiles, and Tubes
- ISO 6361: Wrought Aluminium and Aluminium Alloy Sheets, Strips and Plates

== Chemical composition ==
The alloy composition of 2219 aluminium is:

- Aluminium: 91.5 to 93.8%
- Copper: 5.8 to 6.8%
- Iron: 0.3% max
- Magnesium: 0.02% max
- Manganese: 0.2 to 0.4%
- Silicon: 0.2% max
- Titanium: 0.02 to 0.10%
- Vanadium: 0.05 to 0.15%
- Zinc: 0.1% max
- Zirconium: 0.10 to 0.25%
- Residuals: 0.15% max
