= 3102 aluminium alloy =

Wrought aluminum manganese alloy

3102 aluminium alloy is an alloy in the wrought aluminium-manganese family (3000 or 3xxx series). It is one of the most lightly alloyed grades in the 3000 series, with at least 97.85% aluminium by weight. Like most other aluminium-manganese alloys, 3102 is a general-purpose alloy with moderate strength, good workability, and good corrosion resistance. Being lightly alloyed, it tends on the lower strength and higher corrosion resistance side. It can be cold worked to produce tempers with a higher strength but a lower ductility. It can be formed by rolling, extrusion, and forging. As a wrought alloy, it is not used in casting.

3102 aluminium can be alternately referred to by the UNS designation A93102. The alloy and its various tempers are covered by the following ASTM standards:

- ASTM B 210: Standard Specification for Aluminium and Aluminium-Alloy Drawn Seamless Tubes
- ASTM B 221: Standard Specification for Aluminium and Aluminium-Alloy Extruded Bars, Rods, Wire, Profiles, and Tubes
- ASTM B 483: Standard Specification for Aluminium and Aluminium-Alloy Drawn Tube and Pipe for General Purpose Applications
- ASTM B 491: Standard Specification for Aluminium and Aluminium-Alloy Extruded Round Tubes for General-Purpose Applications

== Chemical composition ==
The alloy composition of 3102 aluminium is:

- Aluminium: 97.85 to 99.95%
- Copper: 0.1% max
- Iron: 0.7% max
- Manganese: 0.05 to 0.40%
- Silicon: 0.4% max
- Titanium: 0.1% max
- Zinc: 0.3% max
- Residuals: 0.15% max
