= Aluminium–silicon alloys =

Aluminium–silicon alloys or Silumin is a general name for a group of lightweight, high-strength aluminium alloys based on an aluminum–silicon system (AlSi) that consist predominantly of aluminum – with silicon as the quantitatively most important alloying element. Pure AlSi alloys cannot be hardened, the commonly used alloys AlSiCu (with copper) and AlSiMg (with magnesium) can be hardened. The hardening mechanism corresponds to that of AlCu and AlMgSi.

AlSi alloys are by far the most important of all aluminum cast materials. They are suitable for all casting processes and have excellent casting properties. Important areas of application are in car parts, including engine blocks and pistons. In addition, their use as a functional material for high-energy heat storage in electric vehicles is currently being focused on.

== Alloying elements ==
Aluminium-silicon alloys typically contain 3% to 25% silicon content. Casting is the primary use of aluminum-silicon alloys, but they can also be utilized in rapid solidification processes and powder metallurgy. Alloys used by powder metallurgy, rather than casting, may contain even more silicon, up to 50%. Silumin has a high resistance to corrosion, making it useful in humid environments.

The addition of silicon to aluminum also makes it less viscous when in liquid form, which, together with its low cost (as both component elements are relatively cheap to extract), makes it a very good casting alloy. Silumin with good castability may give a stronger finished casting than a potentially stronger alloy that is more difficult to cast.

All aluminum alloys also contain iron as an admixture. It is generally undesirable because it lowers strength and elongation at break. Together with Al and Si it forms the $\beta$-phase AlFeSi, which is present in the structure in the form of small needles. However, iron also prevents the castings from sticking to the molds in die casting, so that special die-casting alloys contain a small amount of iron, while iron is avoided as far as possible in other alloys.

Manganese also reduces the tendency to stick, but affects the mechanical properties less than iron. Manganese forms a phase with other elements that is in the form of globulitic (round) grains.

Copper occurs in almost all technical alloys, at least as an admixture. From a content of 0.05% Cu, the corrosion resistance is reduced. Additions of about 1% Cu are alloyed to increase strength through solid solution strengthening. This also improves machinability. In the case of the AlSiCu alloys, higher proportions of copper are also added, which means that the materials can be hardened (see Aluminum-copper alloy).

Together with silicon, magnesium forms the Mg_{2}Si (magnesium silicide) phase, which is the basis of hardenability, similar to aluminum-magnesium-silicon alloys (AlMgSi). In these there is an excess of Mg, so the structure consists of aluminum mixed crystal with magnesium and Mg_{2}Si. In the AlSiMg alloys, on the other hand, there is an excess of silicon and the structure consists of aluminum mixed crystal, silicon and Mg_{2}Si.

Silicon powders are used in aluminum-silicon alloys for enhancing strength and castability, providing better durability under high-stress conditions. It also improves the fluidity of molten aluminum which allows easier casting of complex shapes with fewer defects.

Small additions of titanium and boron serve to refine the grain.

== Pure aluminium–silicon alloys ==
Aluminum-silicon phase diagram

Aluminum forms a eutectic with silicon, which is at 577 °C, with a Si content of 12.5% or 12.6%. Up to 1.65% Si can be dissolved in aluminum at this temperature. However, the solubility decreases rapidly with temperature. At 500 °C it is still 0.8% Si, at 400 °C 0.3% Si and at 250 °C only 0.05% Si. At room temperature, silicon is practically insoluble. Aluminum cannot be dissolved in silicon at all, not even at high temperatures. Only in the molten state are both completely soluble. Increases in strength due to solid solution strengthening are negligible.

Pure AlSi alloys are smelted from primary aluminium, while AlSi alloys with other elements are usually smelted from secondary aluminium. The pure AlSi alloys are medium strength, non-hardenable, but corrosion resistant, even in salt water environments.

The exact properties depend on whether the composition of the alloy is above, near or below the eutectic point. Castability increases with increasing Si content and is best at about 17% Si; the mechanical properties are best at 6% to 12% Si.

- The mold filling capacity reaches its maximum at 12% Si, but is also good with other contents.
- The tendency to form cavities is lowest at 6% to 8% Si and considered low overall.
- The tendency to hot cracking is low with less than 6% Si.

Otherwise, AlSi alloys generally have favorable casting properties: the shrinkage is only 1.25% and the influence of the wall thickness is small.

Hypereutectic alloys, with a silicon content of 16 to 19%, such as Alusil, can be used in high-wear applications such as pistons, cylinder liners and internal combustion engine blocks. The metal is etched after casting, exposing hard, wear-resistant silicon precipitates. The rest of the surface becomes slightly porous and retains oil. Overall this makes for an excellent bearing surface, and at lower cost than traditional bronze bearing bushes.

=== Hypoeutectic alloys ===
Hypoeutectic alloys have a silicon content of less than 12%. With them, the aluminum solidifies first. As the temperature falls and the proportion of solidified aluminum increases, the silicon content of the residual melt increases until the eutectic point is reached. Then the entire residual melt solidifies as a eutectic. The microstructure is consequently characterized by primary aluminium, which is often present in the form of dendrites, and the eutectic of the residual melt lying between them. The lower the silicon content, the larger the dendrites.

In pure AlSi alloys, the eutectic is often in a degenerate form. Instead of the fine structure that is otherwise typical of eutectics with its good mechanical properties, AlSi takes the form of a coarse-grained structure on slow cooling, in which silicon forms large plates or needles. These can sometimes be seen with the naked eye and make the material brittle. This is not a problem in chill casting, since the cooling rates are high enough to avoid degeneration.

In sand casting in particular, with its slow cooling rates, additional elements are added to the melt to prevent degeneration. Sodium, strontium and antimony are suitable. These elements are added to the melt at around 720 °C to 780 °C, causing supercooling that reduces the diffusion of silicon, resulting in a common fine eutectic, resulting in higher strength and elongation at break.

=== Eutectic and near-eutectic alloys ===
Alloys with 11% Si to 13% Si are counted among the eutectic alloys. Annealing improves elongation and fatigue strength. Solidification is shell -forming in untreated alloys and smooth-walled in refined alloys, resulting in very good castability. Above all, the flowability and mold filling ability is very good, which is why eutectic alloys are suitable for thin-walled parts.

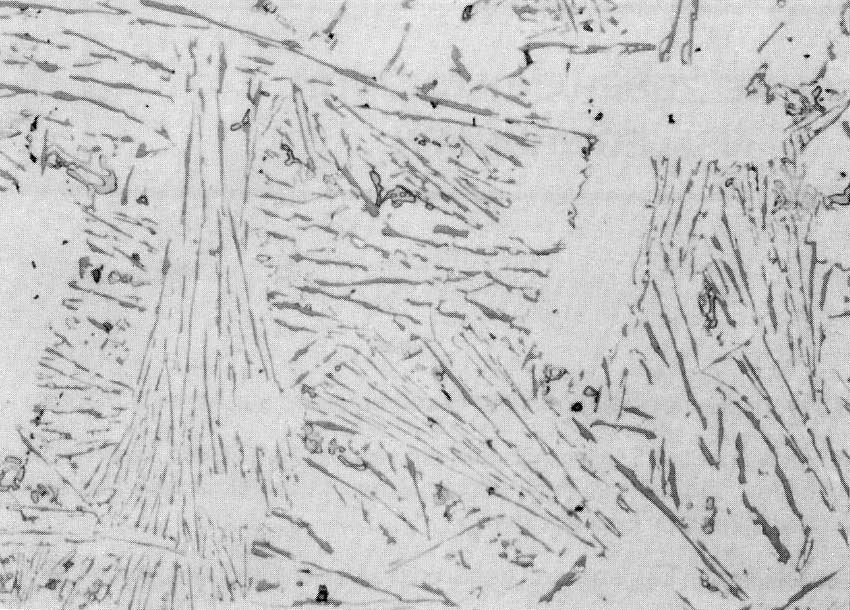
Structure, unrefined

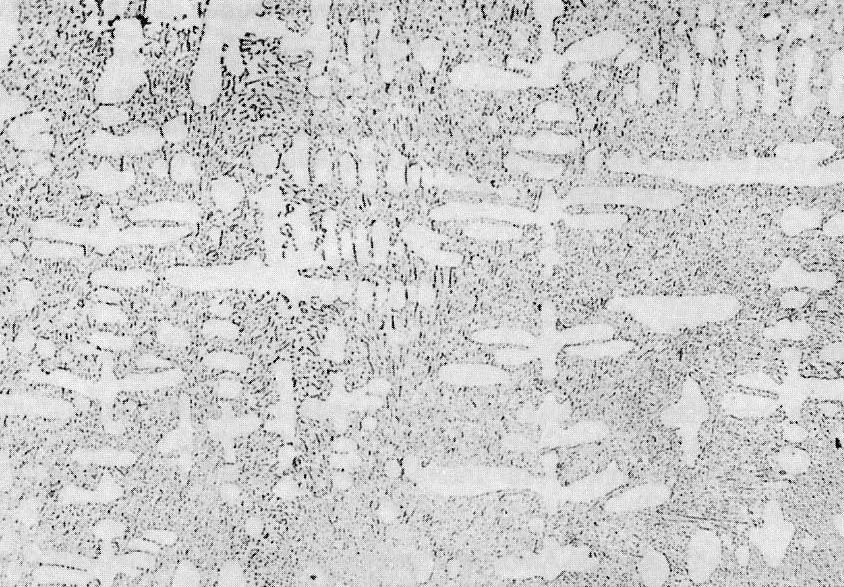
Structure, refined

=== Hypereutectic alloys ===
Alloys with more than 13% Si are referred to as over- or hypereutectic. The Si content is usually up to 17%, with special piston alloys also over 20%. Hypereutectic alloys have very low thermal expansion and are very wear-resistant. In contrast to many other alloys, AlSi alloys do not show their maximum fluidity near the eutectic, but at 14 to 16% Si, in the case of overheating at 17% to 18% Si. The tendency to hot cracking is minimal in the range from 10% to 14%. In the case of hypereutectic alloys, the silicon crystals solidify first in the melt, until the remaining melt solidifies as a eutectic. For grain refinement copper-phosphorus alloys are used. The hard and brittle silicon leads to increased tool wear during subsequent machining, which is why diamond tools are sometimes used (see also Machinability § Aluminium).

== Aluminium–silicon–magnesium alloys ==
AlSiMg alloys with small additions of magnesium (below 0.3 to 0.6% Mg) can be hardened both cold and warm. The proportion of magnesium decreases with increasing silicon content, which is between 5% Si and 10% Si. They are related to the AlMgSi alloys: Both are based on the fact that magnesium silicide Mg_{2}Si is precipitated, which is present in the material in the form of finely divided particles and thus increases the strength. In addition, magnesium increases the elongation at break. In contrast to AlSiCu, which can also be hardened, these alloys are corrosion-resistant and easy to cast. However, copper is present as an impurity in some AlSiMg alloys, which reduces corrosion resistance. This applies above all to materials that have been melted from secondary aluminium.

== Aluminium–silicon–copper alloys ==
AlSiCu alloys are also heat-hardenable and additionally high-strength, but susceptible to corrosion and less, but still adequately, castable. It is often smelted from secondary aluminium. The hardening is based on the same mechanism as the AlCu alloys. The copper content is 1% to 4%, that of silicon 4% to 10%. Small additions of magnesium improve strength.

== Compositions of standardized varieties ==
All data are in percent by mass. The rest is aluminum.

Wrought alloys

numeric	chemical	silicon	iron	copper	manganese	magnesium
EN AW-4004	AlSi10Mg1.5	9.0–10.5	0.8	0.25	0.10	1.0–2.0
EN AW-4014	AlSi2	1.4–2.2	0.7	0.20	0.35	0.30–0.8

Cast Alloys

numeric	chemical	silicon	iron	copper	manganese	magnesium
EN AC-42000	AlSi7Mg	6.5–7.5	0.45	0.15	0.35	0.25–0.65
EN AC-42200	AlSi7Mg0.6	6.5–7.5	0.15	0.03	0.1	0.45–0.7
EN AC-43400	AlSi10Mg(Fe)	9.0–11.0	1.0	0.10	0.001–0.4	0.2–0.5
EN AC-45000	AlSi6Cu4	5.0–7.0	1.0	3.0–5.0	0.20–0.65	0.55
EN AC-47000	AlSi12(Cu)	10.5–13.5	0.8	1.0	0.05	0.35

== Mechanical properties of standardized and non-standard grades ==
Chemical	Condition	Tensile strength [MPa]	Yield strength [MPa]	Elongation at break [%]	Brinell hardness [HB]
AlSi7Mg	Sand casting, cast condition; Sand cast, artificially aged; Gravity die casting, cast condition; Gravity die casting, artificially aged	140; 220; 170; 260	80; 180; 90; 220	2; 1; 2.5; 1	50; 75; 55; 90
AlSi7Mg0.6	Sand cast, artificially aged	230	190	2	75
AlSi10Mg(Fe)	Die cast, cast condition	240	140	1	70
AlSi6Cu4	Sand casting, cast condition	150	90	1	60
AlSi12(Cu)	Sand casting, cast condition	150	70	6	45
AlSi17Cu4Mg (A390)	Gravity die casting, cast condition	200	200	<1	110

== 4000 series ==
4000 series are alloyed with silicon. Variations of aluminium–silicon alloys intended for casting (and therefore not included in 4000 series) are also known as silumin.

4000 series aluminium alloy nominal composition (% weight) and applications
Alloy	Al contents	Alloying elements	Uses and refs
4006	98.3	Si 1.0; Fe 0.65	Work-hardened or aged
4007	96.3	Si 1.4; Mn 1.2; Fe 0.7; Ni 0.3; Cr 0.1	Work-hardened
4015	96.8	Si 2.0; Mn 1.0; Mg 0.2	Work-hardened
4032	85	Si 12.2; Cu 0.9; Mg 1; Ni 0.9;	Forgings
4043	94.8	Si 5.2	Rod
4047	85.5	Si 12.0; Fe 0.8; Cu 0.3; Zn 0.2; Mn 0.15; Mg 0.1	Sheet, cladding, fillers
4543	93.7	Si 6.0; Mg 0.3	architectural extrusions

== Applications ==
Within the Aluminum Association numeric designation system, Silumin corresponds to alloys of two systems: 3xxx, aluminum–silicon alloys also containing magnesium and/or copper, and 4xx.x, binary aluminum–silicon alloys. Copper increases strength, but reduces corrosion resistance.

In general, AlSi alloys are mainly used in foundries, especially for vehicle construction. Wrought alloys are very rare. They are used as a filler metal (welding wire) or as a solder in brazing. In some cases, forged AlSi pistons are also built for aviation.

AlSi eutectic casting alloys are used for machine parts, cylinder heads, cylinder crankcases, impellers and ribbed bodies. Hypereutectic (high silicon) alloys are used for engine parts because of low thermal expansion and high strength and wear resistance. This also includes special piston alloys with around 25% Si.

Alloys with additions of magnesium (AlSiMg) can be hardened by heat treatment. An example use-case are wheel rims produced by low-pressure casting because of their good strength, corrosion resistance and elongation at break. Alloys with about 10% Si are used for cylinder heads, switch housings, intake manifolds, transformer tanks, wheel suspensions and oil pans. Alloys with 5% Si to 7% Si are used for chassis parts and wheels. At levels of 9%, they are suitable for structural components and body nodes.

The copper-containing AlSiCu alloys are used for gear housings, crankcases and cylinder heads because of their heat resistance and hardenability.

Almost eutectic AlSi melts are also used for hot-dip aluminizing. In the process of continuous strip galvanizing, steel strips are finished with a heat-resistant metallic coating 10–25 μm thick. Hot-dip aluminized sheet steel is an inexpensive material for thermally stressed components. Unlike zinc coatings, the coating does not provide cathodic protection under atmospheric conditions.

=== Latent heat storage ===
In addition to the use of AlSi alloys as a structural material, in which the mechanical properties are paramount, another area of application is latent heat storage. In the phase change of the alloy at 577 °C, thermal energy can be stored in the form of the enthalpy of fusion. AlSi can therefore also be used as a metallic phase change material (mPCM) be used. Compared to other phase change materials, metals are characterized by a high specific energy density combined with high thermal conductivity. The latter is important for the rapid entry and exit of heat in the storage material and thus increases the performance of a heat storage system. These advantageous properties of mPCM such as AlSi are of particular importance for vehicle applications, since low masses and volumes as well as high thermal performance are the main goals here. By using storage systems based on mPCM, the range of electric cars can be increased by thermally storing the necessary thermal energy for heating in the mPCM instead of taking it from the traction battery.

== Characteristics ==
- High castability, fluidity, corrosion resistance, ductility, and low density.
- Usable for large castings, which can operate under heavy load conditions.
- Considered to not be a heat-treatable alloy, but the addition of Mg & Cu can allow it to be heat treated, e.g. AΠ4 alloys.
- Strengthened by solution treatment, e.g. adding 0.01% sodium (in the form of sodium fluoride [NaF] and sodium chloride [NaCl]) to the melt just before casting.
- A disadvantage is a tendency for porosity in the casting, i.e. the casting can become foam-like. This can be avoided by casting under pressure in autoclaves.
