= 6463 aluminium alloy =

The 6463 aluminium alloy is an aluminium alloy in the wrought aluminium-magnesium-silicon family (6000 or 6xxx series). It is related to 6063 aluminium alloy (Aluminum Association designations that only differ in the second digit are variations on the same alloy), but unlike 6063 it is generally not formed using any processes other than extrusion. It is commonly heat treated to produce tempers with a higher strength but lower ductility. Like 6063, it is often used in architectural applications.

Alternate designations include AlMg0.7Si(B) and A96463. The alloy and its various tempers are covered by the following standards:

- ASTM B 221: Standard Specification for Aluminium and Aluminium-Alloy Extruded Bars, Rods, Wire, Profiles, and Tubes
- EN 573-3: Aluminium and aluminium alloys. Chemical composition and form of wrought products. Chemical composition and form of products
- EN 755-2: Aluminium and aluminium alloys. Extruded rod/bar, tube and profiles. Mechanical properties

== Chemical composition ==
The alloy composition of 6463 aluminium is:

- Aluminium: 97.9 to 99.4%
- Copper: 0.2% max
- Iron: 0.15% max
- Magnesium: 0.45 to 0.9%
- Manganese: 0.05% max
- Silicon: 0.2 to 0.6%
- Zinc: 0.05% max
- Residuals: 0.15% max

== Properties ==
Typical material properties for 6463 aluminium alloy include:

- Density: 2.69 g/cm^{3}, or 168 lb/ft^{3}.
- Young's modulus: 70 GPa, or 10 Msi.
- Ultimate tensile strength: 130 to 230 MPa, or 19 to 33 ksi.
- Yield strength: 68 to 190 MPa, or 9.9 to 28 ksi.
- Thermal expansion: 22.1 μm/m-K.
