= 1060 aluminium alloy =

Aluminium alloy

1060 aluminium alloy is an aluminium-based alloy in the "commercially pure" wrought family (1000 or 1xxx series). It is fundamentally very similar to 1050 aluminium alloy, with the difference coming down to 0.1% aluminium by weight. However, while both 1050 and 1060 are covered by the same ISO standard, they are covered by different ASTM standards.

As a wrought alloy, it is typically formed by extrusion or rolling. It is commonly used in the electrical and chemical industries, on account of having high electrical conductivity, corrosion resistance, and workability. It has low mechanical strength compared to more significantly alloyed metals. It can be strengthened by cold working, but not by heat treatment.

Alternate designations include Al99.6 and A91060. It is described in the following standards:

- ASTM B 209: Standard Specification for Aluminium and Aluminium-Alloy Sheet and Plate
- ASTM B 210: Standard Specification for Aluminium and Aluminium-Alloy Drawn Seamless Tubes
- ASTM B 211: Standard Specification for Aluminium and Aluminium-Alloy Bar, Rod, and Wire
- ASTM B 221: Standard Specification for Aluminium and Aluminium-Alloy Extruded Bars, Rods, Wire, Profiles, and Tubes
- ASTM B 483: Standard Specification for Aluminium and Aluminium-Alloy Drawn Tube and Pipe for General Purpose Applications
- ISO 6361: Wrought Aluminium and Aluminium Alloy Sheets, Strips and Plates

== Chemical Composition ==
The alloy composition of 1060 aluminium is:

- Aluminium: 99.6% min
- Copper: 0.05% max
- Iron: 0.35% max
- Magnesium: 0.03% max
- Manganese: 0.03% max
- Silicon: 0.25% max
- Titanium: 0.03% max
- Vanadium: 0.05% max
- Zinc: 0.05% max
