= 5456 aluminium alloy =

Aluminium magnesium alloy

5456 aluminium–magnesium alloy is an alloy in the wrought aluminium-magnesium family (5000 or 5xxx series). While it is closely related to 5356 aluminium alloy (Aluminum Association designations that only differ in the second digit are variations on the same alloy), it is used in structural applications, like most other aluminium-magnesium alloys, and not as filler for welding. As a wrought alloy, it can be formed by rolling, extrusion, and forging (although forging is not common), but not casting. It can be cold worked to produce tempers with a higher strength but a lower ductility. It is susceptible to exfoliation corrosion when held at temperatures above 65 °C (150 °F) for extended periods of time.

5456 aluminium alloy is also known by the UNS designation A95456. The alloy and its various tempers are covered by the following standards:

- ASTM B 209: Standard Specification for Aluminium and Aluminium-Alloy Sheet and Plate
- ASTM B 210: Standard Specification for Aluminium and Aluminium-Alloy Drawn Seamless Tubes
- ASTM B 221: Standard Specification for Aluminium and Aluminium-Alloy Extruded Bars, Rods, Wire, Profiles, and Tubes
- ASTM B 928: Standard Specification for High Magnesium Aluminium-Alloy Sheet and Plate for Marine Service

== Chemical composition ==
The alloy composition of 5456 aluminium is:

- Aluminium: 92.0 to 94.8%
- Chromium: 0.05 to 0.20%
- Copper: 0.1% max
- Iron: 0.4% max
- Magnesium: 4.7 to 5.5%
- Manganese: 0.5 to 1.0%
- Silicon: 0.25% max
- Titanium: 0.2% max
- Zinc: 0.25% max
- Residuals: 0.15% max

== Properties ==
Typical material properties for 5454 aluminium alloy include:

- Density: 2.66 g/cm^{3}, or 166 lb/ft^{3}.
- Young's modulus: 69 GPa, or 10 Msi.
- Electrical conductivity: 29% IACS.
- Ultimate tensile strength: 310 to 350 MPa, or 45 to 51 ksi.
- Thermal Conductivity: 120 W/m-K.
- Thermal Expansion: 23.9 μm/m-K.
