= 6105 aluminium alloy =

6105 aluminium alloy is an alloy in the wrought aluminium-magnesium-silicon family (6000 or 6xxx series). It is one of the least common of the alloys in this series. While most wrought aluminium alloys are covered by multiple standards (from any mixture of ASTM, EN, ISO, and national standard bodies), 6105 is only dealt with in ASTM B221: Standard Specification for Aluminum and Aluminum-Alloy Extruded Bars, Rods, Wire, Profiles, and Tubes. It is formed by extrusion, and supplied in heat treated form. It can alternately referred to by the UNS designation A96105.

== Chemical composition ==
The alloy composition of 6105 aluminium is:

- Aluminium: 97.2 to 99.0%
- Chromium: 0.1% max
- Copper: 0.1% max
- Iron: 0.35% max
- Magnesium: 0.45 to 0.8%
- Manganese: 0.1% max
- Silicon: 0.6 to 1.0%
- Titanium: 0.1% max
- Zinc: 0.1% max
- Residuals: 0.15% max

== Properties ==
Typical material properties for 6105 aluminum alloy include:

- Density: 2.69 g/cm^{3}, or 168 lb/ft^{3}.
- Young's modulus: 70 GPa, or 10 Msi.
- Ultimate tensile strength: 190 to 270 MPa, or 28 to 39 ksi.
- Yield strength: 120 to 260 MPa, or 17 to 38 ksi.
- Thermal Expansion: 21.8 μm/m-K.

The ranges of ultimate tensile strength and yield strength are largely based on the heat treatment that the alloy is subjected to following manufacturing, often T1 (cooled from an elevated temperature shaping process and aged naturally to a substantially stable condition) or T5 (cooled from an elevated temperature shaping process and then artificially aged) for alloy 6105 aluminum.
