= 1100 (disambiguation) =

1100 was a year.

1100 may also refer to:

- Morris 1100, also known as the Austin 1100, MG 1100, Wolseley 1100, and Vaden Plas Princess 1100; a small family car
- Bréguet 1100, a twin-engine light fighter aircraft
- Fiat 1100, a small family car made from 1953 to 1969
  - Fiat 1100 (1937), a small family car made from 1937 to 1953
- Goliath 1100, also known as the Hansa 1100, an automobile
- Simca 1100, also known as the Dodge 1100 and Talbot 1100, a series of compact family cars
- 1100 aluminium alloy, a metal alloy
- Nokia 1100, a mobile phone
- Remington 1100, a shotgun
- 1100 AM, radio stations with this frequency
- Zastava 1100, a small family car based on the Fiat 128
