= 6066 aluminium alloy =

6066 aluminium alloy is an aluminium alloy used in forgings and extrusion for welded structures.
