= Aluminium–scandium alloys =

Aluminium–scandium alloys (AlSc) are aluminum alloys that consist largely of aluminium (Al) and traces of scandium (Sc) as the main alloying elements. In principle, aluminium alloys strengthened with additions of scandium are very similar to traditional nickel-base superalloys in that both are strengthened by coherent, coarsening resistant precipitates with an ordered L1_{2} structure. But Al–Sc alloys contain a much lower volume fraction of precipitates, and the inter-precipitate distance is much smaller than in their nickel-base counterparts. In both cases however, the coarsening resistant precipitates allow the alloys to retain their strength at high temperatures.

== Composition ==
The addition of scandium to aluminium limits grain growth in the heat-affected zone of welded aluminium components. This has two beneficial effects: the precipitated Al_{3}Sc forms smaller crystals than in other aluminium alloys, and the volume of precipitate-free zones at the grain boundaries of age-hardening aluminium alloys is reduced. Scandium is also a potent grain refiner in cast aluminium alloys, and atom for atom, the most potent strengthener in aluminium, both as a result of grain refinement and precipitation strengthening.

The Al_{3}Sc precipitate is a coherent precipitate that strengthens the aluminum matrix by applying elastic strain fields that inhibit dislocation movement (i.e., plastic deformation). An added benefit of scandium additions to aluminum is that the nanoscale Al_{3}Sc precipitates that give the alloy its strength are coarsening resistant at relatively high temperatures (~350 °C). This is in contrast to typical commercial 2xxx and 6xxx alloys, which quickly lose their strength at temperatures above 250 °C due to the rapid coarsening of their strengthening precipitates. The Al_{3}Sc precipitates also increase the yield strength of aluminum alloys by 50–70 MPa (7.3–10.2 ksi).

Al_{3}Sc has an equilibrium L1_{2} superlattice structure. A fine dispersion of nano-scale precipitate can be achieved via heat treatment that can also strengthen the alloys through order hardening.

Recent developments include the additions of transition metals such as Zr and rare earth metals like Er to produce shells surrounding the spherical Al_{3}Sc precipitate that has been shown to increase the coarsening resistance of Al-Sc alloys to ~400 °C. The additions form strengthening precipitates with composition Al_{3}(Sc,Zr,Er). These shells are dictated by the diffusivity of the alloying element and lower the cost of the alloy due to less Sc being substituted in part by Zr while maintaining stability and less Sc being needed to form the precipitate. These efforts led by Profs. Seidman and Dunand at Northwestern University, as well as others in the field, resulted in pioneering aluminum superalloys strengthened with core-shell L1_{2}-structured nanoprecipitates, an f.c.c./L1_{2} dual-phase alloy. These alloys are somewhat competitive with titanium alloys for a wide array of applications. The alloy Al_{20}Li_{20}Mg_{10}Sc_{20}Ti_{30} is as strong as titanium, as light as aluminum, and as hard as some ceramics. However, titanium alloys, which are similar in lightness and strength, are cheaper and much more widely used.

Since 2013, Apworks GmbH, a spin-off of Airbus, has marketed a high-strength Scandium containing aluminium alloy processed using metal 3D-Printing (Laser Powder Bed Fusion) under the trademark Scalmalloy which claims very high strength & ductility.

== Applications ==
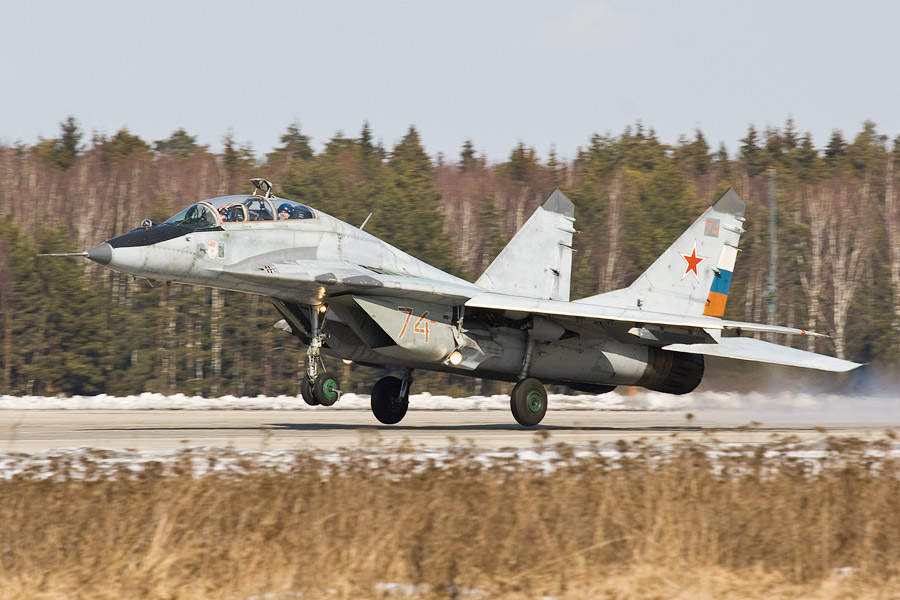
Parts of the MiG-29 are made from Al-Sc alloy.

- The main application of metallic scandium by weight is in aluminium–scandium alloys for minor aerospace industry components. These alloys contain between 0.1% and 0.5% (by weight) of scandium. They were used in the Russian military, specifically the Mikoyan-Gurevich MiG-21 and MiG-29. In this application, it is sometimes known as migram
- The increased operating temperature of Al-Sc alloys has significant implications for energy efficient applications, particularly in the automotive industry. These alloys can provide a replacement for denser materials such as steel and titanium that are used in 250–350 °C environments, such as in or near engines. Replacement of these materials with lighter aluminium alloys leads to weight reductions which in turn leads to increased fuel efficiencies.
- Some items of sports equipment, which rely on lightweight high-performance materials, have been made with scandium-aluminium alloys, including baseball bats, tent poles and bicycle frames and components. Lacrosse sticks are also made with scandium.
- The American firearm manufacturing company Smith & Wesson produces semi-automatic pistols and revolvers with frames of scandium alloy and cylinders of titanium or carbon steel.
