= 1070 aluminium alloy =

Aluminium alloy

1070 is a pure aluminium alloy. It is a wrought alloy with a high corrosion resistance and an excellent brazing ability.

1070 Aluminium alloy has aluminium, iron, silicon, zinc, vanadium, copper, titanium, magnesium, and manganese as minor elements.

== Chemical Composition ==
Element	Content (%)
Aluminum	≥ 99.7
Iron	≤ 0.25
Silicon	≤ 0.20
Zinc	≤ 0.040
Vanadium	≤ 0.050
Copper	≤ 0.040
Titanium	≤ 0.030
Magnesium	≤ 0.030
Manganese	≤ 0.030
Other Elements	≤ 0.030

== Applications ==
Aluminium 1070 alloy is used in the following areas:

1. General industrial components
2. Building and construction
3. Transport
4. Electrical material
5. PS plates
6. Strips for ornaments
7. Communication cables
8. Refrigerator and freezer cabinets
