= 1199 aluminium alloy =

Aluminium alloy

1199 aluminium alloy is an aluminium-based alloy in the "commercially pure" wrought family (1000 or 1xxx series). With a minimum of 99.99% aluminium, it is the purest and least alloyed of the commercial aluminium alloys. It is soft and unsuitable for machining. At the same time, it possesses excellent corrosion resistance, electrical conductivity, and thermal conductivity. Commercially pure aluminium alloys are used in applications such as conductors, capacitors, heat exchangers, packaging foil and chemical equipment.

== Chemical composition ==
The alloy composition of 1199 aluminium is:

- Aluminium: 99.99% min
- Copper: 0.0060% max
- Gallium: 0.0050% max
- Iron: 0.0060% max
- Magnesium: 0.0060% max
- Manganese: 0.0020% max
- Other, each: 0.0020% max
- Silicon: 0.0060% max
- Titanium: 0.0020% max
- Vanadium: 0.0050% max
- Zinc: 0.0060% max
