= 7022 aluminium alloy =

Wrought aluminium zinc alloy

A7022 T651

Physical properties
- Density (ρ): 2.77 g/cm^{3}

Mechanical properties
- Young's modulus (E): 70 GPa
- Tensile strength (σ_{t}): 440 MPa (64 ksi)
- Elongation (ε) at break: 6%
- Poisson's ratio (ν): 0.33
- Hardness—Rockwell: 81 HRB

Thermal properties
- Thermal conductivity (k): 165 W/m*K
- Linear thermal expansion coefficient (α): 2.35*10^{−5} K^{−1}

7022 aluminium alloy is an alloy in the wrought aluminium-zinc family (7000 or 7xxx series). It is one of the more complex grades in the 7000 series, with at least 87.85% aluminium by weight.

Like most other highly alloyed alloys, 7022 is a high strength alloy, with yield strength of 370 MPa. Designed to be resistant to stress corrosion cracking, it has decent corrosion and oxidation resistance comparable to 7075 aluminium alloy but worse than 7039 aluminium alloy. Good machinability, thermal conductivity and dimensional stability make 7022 alloy a material of choice for plastic injection molds.

7022 alloy can be heat treated to increase tensile strength in expense of workability, with most common grade been T651.

Notes: Alternative names for 7022 alloy are A7022 and AA7022.

== Chemical Composition ==
1. Aluminium: 88.35 to 92.4%
2. Zinc: 4.3 to 5.2%
3. Magnesium: 2.6 to 3.7%
4. Copper: 0.5 to 1.0%
5. Manganese: 0.1 to 0.4%
6. Chromium: 0.1 to 0.3%
7. Silicon: 0.5% max
8. Iron: 0.5% max
9. Titanium: 0.2% max
10. Zirconium: 0.2% max
11. Other: 0.15% max

== See also ==
- Aleris (first maker of A7022)
