= 5356 aluminium alloy =

Wrought aluminium magnesium alloy

5356 aluminium alloy is an alloy in the wrought aluminium-magnesium family (5000 or 5xxx series). Unlike most aluminium-magnesium alloys, it is primarily used as welding filler. It is one of the most popular aluminium filler alloys, alongside 4043. It possesses relatively high strength, but at the expense of being more vulnerable to cracking. It is the preferred filler when making lap or butt welds on the popular 6061 aluminium alloy, or when the welded parts are to be anodized.
