= 7055 aluminium alloy =

Aluminium zinc alloy

7055 alloy is heat treatable wrought aluminum alloy. It has high ultimate tensile strength value of 593 MPa.

== Chemical Composition ==
Element	Content (%)
Aluminum	85.9 - 88.5
Zinc	7.6 - 8.4
Magnesium	1.8 - 2.3
Copper	2 - 2.6
Iron	≤ 0.15
Zirconium	0.080 - 0.25
Manganese	≤ 0.050
Chromium	≤ 0.040
Silicon	≤ 0.10
Titanium	≤ 0.060
Other (each)	≤ 0.050
Other (total)	≤ 0.15

== Properties ==
Properties	SI Unit
Density	2.86 g/cm^{3}
Ultimate Tensile Strength	593 MPa
Elongation at Break	9.0% to 12.0%
Fracture Toughness	24.2 MPa-m½

== Applications ==
1. Aerospace sector
2. High strength requirement areas
