= 7079 aluminium alloy =

Aluminium zinc alloy

7079 aluminium alloy (UNS designation A97079) is a high strength, heat treatable wrought aluminium alloy used in the aircraft industry. Age-hardening heat treatment enhances the characteristics of AL 7079, eliminating variations in characteristics seen in Aluminium 7075.

== Chemical composition ==
Element	Zn	Mg	Cu	Fe	Si	Mn	Cr	Ti	Remainder (each)	Remainder (total)	Al
minimum	3.8	2.9	.4	0.00	0.00	.1	.1	0.00	0.00	0.00	Remainder
maximum	4.8	3.7	.8	.4	.3	.3	.25	.1	.5	.15	Remainder

== Heat treatment for aluminium 7079 ==
1. Solution treatment
2. Aging treatment
3. Annealing treatment

== Machinability ==
1. Alloy-temper 7079-T6 provides qualities comparable to alloy-temper 7075-T6
2. -F temper condition provides acceptable results
3. Improved machinability compared to fabricated and annealed tempers

== Workability ==
1. Can be formed similar to 7075
2. Annealing provides superior formability and noticeable decline in workability following solution heat treatment
3. Form in “as-quenched” -W temper condition for best results

== Applications ==
1. Mobile industry equipment
2. Aircraft parts, including wing panels and bulkhead assemblies
3. Hydraulic units
4. Highly stressed parts
