= 1370 aluminium alloy =

Metal Alloy

1370 Aluminium alloy is primarily aluminium (≥99.7%) alloyed with small amounts of boron, chromium, copper, gallium, iron, magnesium, manganese, silicon, vanadium and zinc.

Element	Weight Percentage
Aluminium	≥ 99.70 %
Boron	≤ 0.02 %
Chromium	≤ 0.01 %
Copper	≤ 0.02 %
Gallium	≤ 0.03 %
Iron	≤ 0.25 %
Magnesium	≤ 0.02 %
Manganese	≤ 0.01 %
Other, each	≤ 0.02 %
Other, total	≤ 0.10 %
Silicon	≤ 0.10 %
V+Ti	≥ 0.02 %
Zinc	≤ 0.04 %

== Properties of Aluminium alloy ==
Properties	Value
Density	2.70 g/cc
Tensile Strength, Ultimate	83.0 MPa
Tensile Strength, Yield	28.0 MPa
Elongation at Break	28 %
Modulus of Elasticity	68.9 GPa
Electrical Resistivity	0.00000280 ohm-cm
Thermal Conductivity	234 W/m-K
