= 7068 aluminium alloy =

Aluminum zinc alloy

7068 aluminium alloy is one of the strongest commercially available aluminium alloys, with a tensile strength comparable to that of some steels. This material, also known as an aircraft alloy, is heat treatable.

7068-T6511 has typical ultimate tensile strength of 710 MPa (103 ksi) versus a similar product produced from 7075-T6511 that would have a typical ultimate tensile strength of 640 MPa (93 ksi). Typical yield strength for alloy 7068-T6511 is 683 MPa (99.1 ksi) versus 590 MPa (86 ksi) for a similar product produced from 7075-T6511. Strength allowables for this alloy are provided in Metallic Materials Properties Development and Standardization for design.

The main alloying elements are zinc (7.3 to 8.3%), magnesium (2.2 to 3.0%), copper (1.6 to 2.4%) and zirconium (0.05 to 0.15%), with traces of silicon, iron, manganese, chromium, and titanium.

== Chemical composition ==
Element	Weight percentage (%)
Aluminum, Al	85.43
Zinc, Zn	8.3
Magnesium, Mg	3
Copper, Cu	2.4
Iron, Fe	0.15
Zirconium, Zr	0.15
Silicon, Si	0.12
Manganese, Mn	0.1
Titanium, Ti	0.1
Chromium, Cr	0.05
Other (each)	0.05
Other (total)	0.15

== Physical properties ==
Properties	Metric
Density	2.85 g/cm^{3}
Melting point	476–635 °C

== Mechanical properties ==
Properties	Metric
Tensile strength	641 MPa
Yield strength	590 MPa
Elongation	8%

== Thermal Properties ==
Properties	Metric
Thermal conductivity	190 W/mK

== Technical description ==
7068 alloy is a 7000 series aluminium-zinc alloy registered with the US Aluminium Association and produced to AMS 4331 (chemical composition and mechanical properties) and AMS 2772 (heat treatment). 7068 alloy ‘A’ and ‘B’ tensile data and fatigue properties have been ratified for inclusion in MIL Handbook 5 / MMPDS.

== Uses ==
Primarily developed for ordnance applications, alloy 7068 is now being used or considered for markets like the aerospace and automotive industries (valve body and connecting rod applications), medical devices, such as prosthetic limbs, as well as recreational products like bicycles and mountain-climbing equipment.

== Application ==
Applications of this alloy include: Connecting rods, Shock absorbers, Fuel pumps, Rocker arms, Bearing caps, Prosthetics, Chain tensioners.

== Standard specifications ==
Standard specifications for AL 7068 include:

- AMS 4331
- AMS 2772
