= 1350 aluminium alloy =

Aluminium alloy

1350 aluminium alloy is nearly pure aluminium consist of minimum of weight percentage of 99.5% of Aluminium.

== Chemical composition ==
Element	Content (%)
Aluminium	99.50 (min)

== Physical properties ==
Properties	Metric
Density	2.6-2.8 g/cm3
Elastic modulus	70-80 GPa
Poisson's ratio	0.33
Thermal conductivity	230 (W/mK)

== Other designations ==
ASTM B230	ASTM B231	ASTM B232	ASTM B233	ASTM B236
ASTM B314	ASTM B323	ASTM B324	ASTM B400	ASTM B401
ASTM B524	ASTM B549	ASTM B609	SAE J454 (EC-O)	

== Applications ==
1. Electrical conductors.
