= 8030 aluminium alloy =

Copper and iron aluminum alloy

8030 aluminum alloy is produced using iron and copper as additives. It is commonly used in electronics due to high thermal stability and electrical conductivity.

== Chemical composition ==
Element	Content (%)
Aluminum	≥ 98.9
Iron	0.30-0.80
Copper	0.15-0.30

== Applications ==
Aluminium 8030 is used in high voltage power transmission lines.
