= 2091 aluminium alloy =

Aluminium copper alloy

2091 aluminium has chromium, copper, iron, lithium, magnesium as minor alloying elements.

== Chemical composition ==
Element	Value
Aluminum	91.9 - 95.4%
Chromium	≤ 0.10%
Copper	1.8 - 2.5%
Iron	≤ 0.30%
Lithium	1.7 - 2.3%
Magnesium	1.1 - 1.9%
Manganese	≤ 0.10%
Other, each	≤ 0.05%
Other, total	≤ 0.15%
Silicon	≤ 0.20%
Titanium	≤<= 0.10%
Zinc	≤ 0.25%
Zirconium	0.04 - 0.16%

== Properties ==
Properties	Value
Density	2.58 g/cc
Tensile Strength, Ultimate	430 MPa
Tensile Strength, Yield	330 MPa
Elongation at Break	18 %
Modulus of Elasticity	75.0 GPa
CTE, linear	23.9 μm/m-°C @Temperature 20.0 - 100 °C
Specific Heat Capacity	0.860 J/g-°C at Temperature 100 °C
Thermal Conductivity	84.0 W/m-K
Melting Point	560 - 670 °C
Solidus	560 °C
Liquidus	670 °C
