= 2090 aluminium alloy =

Aluminum copper alloy

2090 Aluminium alloy consists of copper, lithium, zirconium as minor elements and other impurity alloying elements.

== Chemical composition ==
Element	Weight Percentage (%)
Aluminum	93.2 - 95.6
Copper	2.4 - 3
Lithium	1.9 - 2.6
Magnesium	≤ 0.25
Titanium	≤ 0.15
Iron	≤ 0.12
Zinc	≤ 0.10
Silicon	≤ 0.10
Zirconium	0.080 - 0.15
Manganese	≤ 0.050
Chromium	≤ 0.050
Other (each)	≤ 0.050
Other (total)	≤ 0.15

== Physical properties ==
Properties	Values
Density	2.59 g/cm^{3}
Melting point	560 - 650 °C

== Mechanical properties ==
Properties	Values
Tensile strength	550 MPa
Yield strength	520 MPa
Elongation at break	6%
Poisson's ratio	0.34
Elastic modulus	76 GPa

== Thermal properties ==
Thermal Properties	Metric
CTE, linear	23.6 μm/m-°C at Temperature 20.0 - 100 °C
Specific Heat Capacity	1.203 J/g-°C at Temperature 100 °C
Thermal Conductivity	88.0 W/m-K
Melting Point	560 - 650 °C
Solidus	560 °C
Liquidus	650 °C

== Applications ==
Aluminium 2090 alloy is used in aircraft components.

- Aircraft floor bulkhead stiffeners
- Wing leading and trailing edges
- Fuselage bulkhead webs
