= 6063 aluminium alloy =

Aluminum alloy with magnesium and silicon

A6063

Physical properties
- Density (ρ): 2.69 g/cm^{3}

Mechanical properties
- Young's modulus (E): 68.9 GPa (9,990 ksi)
- Tensile strength (σ_{t}): 145–186 MPa (21.0–27.0 ksi)
- Elongation (ε) at break: 18–33%
- Poisson's ratio (ν): 0.33

Thermal properties
- Melting temperature (T_{m}): 615 °C (1,139 °F)
- Thermal conductivity (k): 201–218 W/[m·K]
- Linear thermal expansion coefficient (α): 2.34·10^{−5}/K
- Specific heat capacity (c): 900 J/kg·K

Electrical properties
- Volume resistivity (ρ): 30–35 n Ohm·m

AA 6063 is an aluminium alloy, with magnesium and silicon as the alloying elements. The standard controlling its composition is maintained by The Aluminum Association. It has generally good mechanical properties and is heat treatable and weldable. It is similar to the British aluminium alloy HE9.

6063 is the most common alloy used for aluminium extrusion. It allows complex shapes to be formed with very smooth surfaces fit for anodizing and is popular for visible architectural applications such as window frames, door frames, roofs, and sign frames. Applications requiring higher strength typically use 6061 or 6082 instead.

== Chemical composition ==
The alloy composition of 6063 is:

Aluminum alloy 6063
Constituent element	Minimum (% by weight)	Maximum (% by weight)
Aluminium (Al)	97.5%	99.35%
Magnesium (Mg)	0.45%	0.90%
Silicon (Si)	0.20%	0.60%
Iron (Fe)	0	0.35%
Chromium (Cr)	0	0.10%
Copper (Cu)	0	0.10%
Manganese (Mn)	0	0.10%
Titanium (Ti)	0	0.10%
Zinc (Zn)	0	0.10%
(others)	0	0.15% total (0.05% each)

== Mechanical properties ==
The mechanical properties of 6063 depend greatly on the temper, or heat treatment, of the material.

=== 6063-O ===
Un-heat-treated 6063 has maximum tensile strength no more than 130 MPa (19,000 psi), and no specified maximum yield strength. The material has elongation (stretch before ultimate failure) of 18%.

=== 6063-T1 ===
T1 temper 6063 has an ultimate tensile strength of at least 120 MPa (17,000 psi) in thicknesses up to 12.7 mm (0.5 in), and 110 MPa (16,000 psi) from 13 to 25 mm (0.5 to 1 in) thick, and yield strength of at least 62 MPa (9,000 psi) in thickness up to 13 millimetres (0.5 in) and 55 MPa (8,000 psi) from 13 mm (0.5 in) thick. It has elongation of 12%.

=== 6063-T5 ===
T5 temper 6063 has an ultimate tensile strength of at least 140 MPa (20,000 psi) in thicknesses up to 13 millimetres (0.5 in), and 130 MPa (19,000 psi) from 13 mm (0.5 in) thick, and yield strength of at least 97 MPa (14,000 psi) up to 13 millimetres (0.5 in) and 90 MPa (13,000 psi) from13 to 25 mm (0.5 to 1 in). It has elongation of 8%.

=== 6063-T6 ===
T6 temper 6063 has an ultimate tensile strength of at least 190 MPa (28,000 psi) and yield strength of at least 160 MPa (23,000 psi). In thicknesses of 3.15 millimetres (0.124 in) or less, it has elongation of 8% or more; in thicker sections, it has elongation of 10%.

=== Other tempers ===
6063 is also produced in tempers T52, T53, T54, T55, and T832, with various improved desired properties.

== Uses ==
6063 is used for architectural fabrication, various automotive components, window and door frames, pipe and tubing, and aluminium furniture.

=== Welding ===
6063 is highly weldable, using tungsten inert gas welding. Typically, after welding, the properties near the weld are those of 6063-0, a loss of strength of up to 30%. The material can be re-heat-treated to restore a higher temper for the whole piece.
