= 1200 aluminium alloy =

Aluminium alloy

1200 Aluminium alloy has aluminium as the major element, and has silicon, zinc, copper, titanium and manganese as minor elements.

== Chemical Composition ==
Element	Weight Percentage (%)
Aluminum	≥ 99
Silicon + Iron	≤ 1
Zinc	≤ 0.10
Copper	≤ 0.050
Titanium	≤ 0.050
Manganese	≤ 0.050
Other (each)	≤ 0.050
Other (total)	≤ 0.15

== Mechanical Properties ==
Property	Value
Young's modulus	69 GPa
Elongation at break	5.1%
Fatigue strength	49 MPa
U.T.S.	130 MPa
Yield strength	100 MPa
Latent Heat of Fusion	400 J/g
Specific Heat Capacity	900 J/kg-K
Thermal Conductivity	230 W/m-K

== Applications ==
Applications of 1200 Aluminium alloy are listed below:

1. Construction and roofing
2. Holloware
3. Equipment and containers for food and chemical industries
4. Ship building
5. Fin-stocks
6. Bottle caps
7. Automobiles
8. Furniture and lighting
9. Sounding boards
10. Conductive materials
