= 7150 aluminium alloy =

Wrought aluminium zinc alloy

Aluminium 7150 alloy is a heat treatable wrought alloy. It is used in the aerospace industry for manufacturing aircraft components. Heat treatment can improve its anti-corrosion properties with a low corresponding decrease in strength.

== Chemical composition ==
Element	Content (%)
Aluminum	85.9 - 89.5
Zinc	7.2 - 8.2
Magnesium	2 - 2.9
Copper	1.2 - 1.9
Silicon	≤ 0.15
Titanium	≤ 0.10
Iron	≤ 0.20
Chromium	0.10 - 0.22
Manganese	≤ 0.20
Other (total)	≤ 0.15

== Properties ==
Properties	Value
Density	2.84 g/cm^{3}
Ultimate tensile strength	607 MPa
Yield strength	565 MPa
Elongation at break	11%
Fracture toughness	26.4 MPa-m½

== Alternate designations ==
It has the following alternate designations:

- AA 7150
- AMS 4252A
- 4306A
- 4307S
- 4345A
- UNS A97150
