= 7010 aluminium alloy =

Wrought aluminum alloy

Aluminium 7010 alloy is a wrought aluminum alloy. It is medium strength, having high corrosion and damage tolerance ability.

== Chemical Composition ==
| Element | Content (%) |
|---|---|
| Aluminum, Al | 87.8 - 90.6 |
| Zinc, Zn | 5.70 - 6.70 |
| Magnesium, Mg | 2.10 - 2.60 |
| Copper, Cu | 1.50 - 2.0 |
| Iron, Fe | 0.15 |
| Zirconium, Zr | 0.10 - 0.16 |
| Silicon, Si | 0.12 |
| Manganese, Mn | 0.10 |
| Titanium, Ti | 0.060 |
| Chromium, Cr | 0.050 |
| Nickel, Ni | 0.050 |
| Other, total | 0.15 |
| Other, each | 0.050 |

== Physical Properties ==
| Physical Properties | Value |
|---|---|
| Density | 2.81 g/cm^{3} |
| Melting Point | 475 °C |
| Modulus of Elasticity | 71 GPa |
| Thermal Conductivity | 150 W/m.K |

== Mechanical Properties ==
| Mechanical Properties | Value |
|---|---|
| Yield Strength | 530 MPa |
| Elongation A50 mm | %8 |
| Modulus of Elasticity | 71 GPa |

== Other Designations ==
1. AMS 4203
2. AMS 4204
3. AMS 4205

== Applications ==
1. Close die forgings for aerospace
2. Forged bars for aerospace components
3. High strength aerospace component

== Features ==
1. High strength alloy
2. High fatigue strength
3. High Stress corrosion resistance
4. Not for high temperature
5. High Corrosion resistance
