= 8090 aluminium alloy =

Aluminum alloy with lithium, copper and magnesium

8090 aluminium alloy is produced using lithium, copper and magnesium as additives. It is commonly used in aerospace due to having a lower density than 6000 or 2000 series aluminium. 8090 aluminium was developed as a replacement to 2114 and 2024 alloys and has a higher elastic modulus and lower density.

== Chemical composition ==
Element	Content (%)
Aluminium	≥ 93
Lithium	2.2-2.7
Copper	1.0-1.6
Magnesium	0.6-1.3

== Applications ==
Aluminium 8090 is used in aerospace applications due to its low density; for example it is used in the AgustaWestland EH101 helicopter. 8090 can also be extruded.
