= 7049 aluminium alloy =

Aluminium alloy

The Aluminum / aluminum 7049 alloy is a forging aluminum alloy. It has a high stress, corrosion, and cracking resistance and high machinability. Alloy can be hot formed. It can not be weldable (in some cases, tungsten inert gas welding can applied).

== Chemical Composition ==
No	Element	Content (%)
1	Aluminium	88.7
2	Zinc	7.6
3	Magnesium	2.5
4	Copper	1.5
5	Chromium	0.15

== Properties ==
No	Properties	SI Unit
1	Density	2.6 to 2.8 g/cm3
2	Elastic modulus	70 to 80 GPa
3	Poisson's ratio	0.33
4	Thermal conductivity	154 W/mK
5	Tensile Strength, Ultimate	517 MPa
6	Fatigue strength	160 to 170 MPa
7	Specific Heat Capacity	860 J/kg-K

== Applications ==
1. structural forgings, especially in the missile or aircraft industries.
2. aircraft structural parts.
3. Forged aircraft and missile fittings
4. landing gear cylinders
5. extruded sections
6. Structural forgings
7. Missile industries

== Designation ==
Aluminium alloy EN AW 7049 has similarities to the following standard designations and specifications;

1. Alloy 7049
2. UNS A97049
3. ASTM B209
4. DIN AlZn8MgCu
