= 1145 aluminium alloy =

Aluminium alloy

1145 Aluminium alloy is a nearly pure aluminium alloy with minor impurities like copper, manganese, magnesium, zinc, titanium, silicon and iron.

== Chemical composition ==
Element	Content (%)
Aluminum	99.45 (min)
Copper	0.05
Manganese	0.05
Magnesium	0.05
Zinc	0.05
Titanium	0.03
Silicon, Si + Iron, Fe	Remainder

== Physical properties ==
Properties	Metric
Density	2.6-2.8 g/cm3
Elastic modulus	70-80 GPa
Poisson's ratio	0.33
Thermal conductivity	227 W/mK
