= 8176 aluminium alloy =

Aluminum alloy with iron, zinc, and silicon

8176 aluminium alloy is produced using iron, zinc and silicon as additives. It is used in power lines due to its high electrical conductivity.

== Chemical composition ==
Element	Content (%)
Aluminium	≥ 98.5
Iron	0.4-1.0
Zinc	<0.10
Silicon	0.03-0.15

== Applications ==
Aluminium 8176 is used in building wiring and cables.
