= 2004 aluminium alloy =

Aluminium copper alloy

2004 Aluminium is aluminium alloy in 2xxx series, which has Copper as main alloying element and some impurity elements.

== Chemical Composition ==
| Element | Weight Percentage (%) |
|---|---|
| Aluminum | 91.7 - 94.2 % |
| Copper | 5.5 - 6.5 % |
| Iron | <= 0.20 % |
| Magnesium | <= 0.50 % |
| Manganese | <= 0.10 % |
| Other, each | <= 0.05 % |
| Other, total | <= 0.15 % |
| Silicon | <= 0.20 % |
| Titanium | <= 0.05 % |
| Zinc | <= 0.10 % |
| Zirconium | 0.30 - 0.50 % |
