= 7005 aluminium alloy =

Wrought aluminium zinc alloy

7005 is an aluminium wrought alloy used in bicycle frames. Due to its relative ease of welding, it does not require expensive heat treating. It is, however, harder to form, making manufacture more challenging. It has an Ultimate Tensile Strength of 350 MPa, a Fatigue Strength of 150 MPa and a density of 2.78 g/cm^{3}. It does not need to be precipitation hardened, but can be cooled in air.

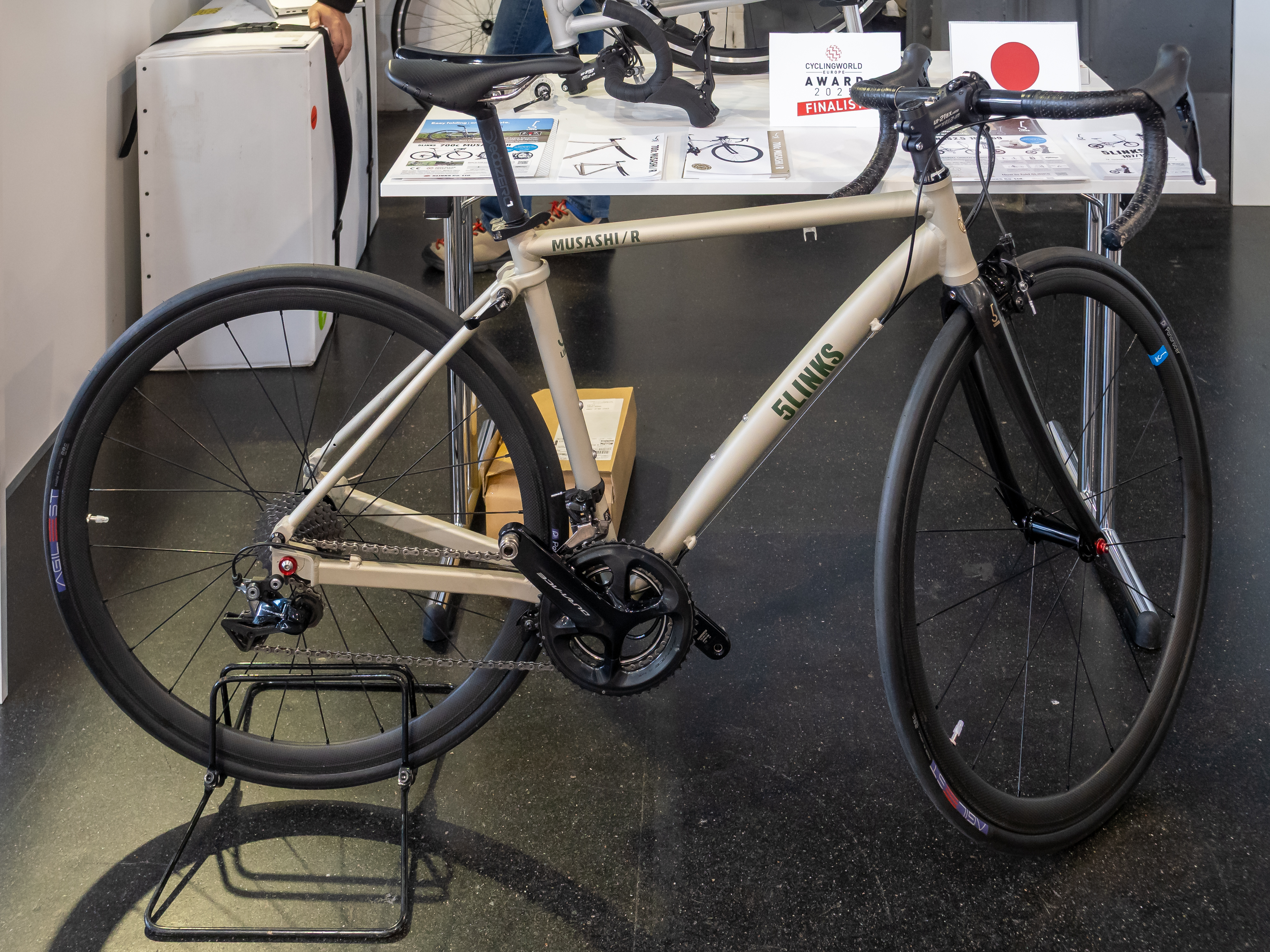
Bicycle frame made out of aluminium alloy

== Specific forms of AL 7005 include ==
1. 7005-O
2. 7005-T5
3. 7005-T53
4. 7005-T6

== Chemical composition ==
The alloy composition of 7005 is:

7005 Aluminum alloy
No	Element	Percentage
1	Aluminium	91.0% - 94.7%
2	Chromium	0.06% - 0.20%
3	Copper	<=0.10 %
4	Iron	<=0.40 %
5	Magnesium	1.0% - 1.80%
6	Manganese	0.20% - 0.70%
7	Silicon	<=0.35%
8	Titanium	0.010% - 0.060%
9	Zinc	4.0% - 5.0%
10	Zirconium	0.080% - 0.20%
11	Other, total	<= 0.15%

== Properties ==
No	Property	Value
1	Density	2.78 g/cm^{3}
2	Elastic modulus	70-80 GPa
3	Poisson Ratio	0.33
4	Thermal conductivity	166 W/mK
5	Ultimate Tensile Strength	350 MPa
6	Fatigue Strength	150 MPa
