= 5086 aluminium alloy =

Aluminium magnesium alloy

5086 aluminium alloy is an aluminium–magnesium alloy, primarily alloyed with magnesium. It is not strengthened by heat treatment, instead becoming stronger due to strain hardening, or cold mechanical working of the material.

Since heat treatment doesn't strongly affect the strength, 5086 can be readily welded and retain most of its mechanical strength. The good results with welding and good corrosion properties in seawater make 5086 extremely popular for vessel gangways, building boat and yacht hulls.

== Basic properties ==
5086 has a density of 2.660 kg/dm^{3} (0.0961 lb/cu in), with a specific gravity of 2.66.

Melting point is 590 °C (1,090 °F).

== Chemical properties ==
The alloy composition of 5086 is:

- Chromium - 0.05%–0.25% by weight
- Copper - 0.1% maximum
- Iron - 0.5% maximum
- Magnesium - 3.5%–4.5%
- Manganese - 0.2%–0.7%
- Silicon - 0.4% maximum
- Titanium - 0.15% maximum
- Zinc - 0.25% maximum
- Others each 0.05% maximum
- Others total 0.15% maximum
- Remainder Aluminium

== Mechanical properties ==
The mechanical properties of 5086 vary significantly with hardening and temperature.

=== –O hardening ===
Unhardened 5086 has a yield strength of 120 MPa (17 ksi) and ultimate tensile strength of 260 MPa (38 ksi) from −28 to 100 °C (−18 to 212 °F). At cryogenic temperatures it is slightly stronger: at −196 °C (−321 °F), yield of 130 MPa (19 ksi) and ultimate tensile strength of 380 MPa (55 ksi); above 100 °C (212 °F) its strength is reduced.

Elongation, the strain before material failure, ranges from 46% at −196 °C (−321 °F), 35% at −80 °C (−112 °F), 32% at −28 °C (−18 °F), 22% at 20 °C (68 °F), 30% at 24 °C (75 °F), 36% at 100 °C (212 °F), and increases above there.

=== –H32 hardening ===
H32 strain hardened 5086, with properties measured at 20 °C (68 °F), has yield strength of 195 MPa (28.3 ksi), ultimate tensile strength of 208 MPa (30.1 ksi), and elongation of 6-12%.

=== –H116 hardening ===
H116 strain hardened 5086, with properties measured at 20 °C (68 °F), has yield strength of 210 MPa (30 ksi), ultimate tensile strength of 290 MPa (42 ksi), and elongation of 12%.

== Uses ==
5086 is the preferred hull material for small aluminium boats or larger yachts. Its high strength and good corrosion resistance make it an excellent match for yachting.

5086 has a tendency to undergo Stress corrosion cracking and is not used much in aircraft construction as a result.

5086 has been used in vehicle armor, notably in the M113 Armored Personnel Carrier and M2 Bradley Infantry fighting vehicle.

=== Welding ===
5086 is often assembled using arc welding, typically MIG or TIG welding. The newer technique of Friction stir welding has also been successfully applied but is not in common use.

Arc welding reduces mechanical properties to no worse than –O hardening condition. For –H116 base material, measured at 20 °C (68 °F) ambient temperature, yield strength decreases from 210 MPa (30 ksi) to 120 MPa (17 ksi) and ultimate strength from 290 to 260 MPa (42 to 38 ksi). The relatively low decrease in ultimate strength (about 10%) is extremely good performance for an aluminium alloy.
