= 1100 aluminium alloy =

Aluminium alloy

1100 aluminium alloy is an aluminium-based alloy in the "commercially pure" wrought family (1000 or 1xxx series). With a minimum of 99.0% aluminium, it is the most heavily alloyed of the 1000 series. It is also the mechanically strongest alloy in the series, and is the only 1000-series alloy commonly used in rivets. At the same time, it keeps the benefits of being relatively lightly alloyed (compared to other series), such as high electrical conductivity, thermal conductivity, corrosion resistance, and workability. It can be hardened by cold working, but not by heat treatment.

Alternate designations include Al99.0Cu and A91100. 1100 and its various tempers are covered by the ISO standard 6361 and the ASTM standards B209, B210, B211, B221, B483, B491, and B547.

== Chemical composition ==
The alloy composition of 1100 aluminium is:

- Aluminium: 99.0–99.95%
- Copper: 0.05–0.20%
- Iron: 0.95% max
- Manganese: 0.05% max
- Silicon: 0.95% max
- Zinc: 0.1% max
- Residuals: 0.15% max
