= 1230 (VAD23) aluminium alloy =

Aluminium alloy

1230 Aluminium Alloy has aluminium as the major element, and has silicon, zinc, copper, titanium, vanadium, manganese and magnesium as minor elements.

== Chemical Composition ==
Element	Weight percentage (%)
Aluminum	≥ 99.3
Silicon, Si + Iron, Fe	≤ 0.70
Zinc	≤ 0.10
Copper	≤ 0.10
Titanium	≤ 0.05
Vanadium	≤ 0.05
Manganese,	≤ 0.05
Magnesium	≤ 0.05
Other (each)	≤ 0.03
