= 8006 aluminium alloy =

Aluminum alloy with iron, manganese and copper

8006 aluminium alloy is produced using iron, manganese and copper as additives. It is commonly rolled into thin sheets or foils and is often used in heat exchangers due to its corrosion resistance. 8006 aluminium is available as plate.

== Chemical composition ==
Element	Content (%)
Aluminium	≥ 95.9
Iron	1.2-2.0
Manganese	0.3-1.0
Copper	< 0.3

== Applications ==
Aluminium 8006 is used in food packing, microelectronics, and in heat exchangers.
