= 7072 aluminium alloy =

Aluminium-zinc alloy

7072 aluminium alloy is an aluminium alloy, created with just one other element; zinc, at one weight percentage.

== Chemical Composition ==
Element	Content (%)
Aluminium, Al	99
Zinc, Zn	1

== Physical Properties ==
Properties	Metric
Density	2.6 - 2.8 g/cm3
Shear strength	62 MPa
Elastic modulus	70-80 GPa
Poisson's ratio	0.33
Thermal conductivity	227 W/mK
Ultimate Tensile Strength	75 MPa

== Designations ==
7072 can be designated as:

1. ASTM B209
2. ASTM B221
3. ASTM B234
4. ASTM B241
5. ASTM B313
6. ASTM B345
7. ASTM B404
8. ASTM B547
