= 5182 aluminium alloy =

Aluminium magnesium alloy

5182 Aluminium alloy has magnesium and manganese as minor elements. 5182 Aluminium alloy is primarily used in the automobile industry for making various parts of vehicles.

== Composition ==
| Element | Weight Percentage (%) |
|---|---|
| Aluminium | 95.2 |
| Magnesium | 4.5 |
| Manganese | 0.3 |

== Mechanical properties ==
| Property | Value |
|---|---|
| Density | 2.7 gm/cc |
| U.T.S. | 280 to 420 MPa |
| Yield strength | 130 to 360 MPa |
| Fatigue strength | 100 to 130 MPa |
| Young's modulus | 68 GPa |

== Thermal properties ==
| Property | Value |
|---|---|
| Melting Point | 640 °C |
| Specific heat capacity | 900 J/kg K |
| Thermal conductivity | 130 W/mK |

== Applications ==
- Audi A8 (D2)’s structural panel
- BMW Z8's inner panel
- Rolls-Royce Phantom's structural panel
- Aluminium can (top part)
