= 1050 aluminium alloy =

Aluminum alloy used in electrical and chemical industries

1050 aluminium alloy is an aluminium-based alloy in the "commercially pure" wrought family (1000 or 1xxx series). As a wrought alloy, it is not used in castings. Instead, it is usually formed by extrusion or rolling. It is commonly used in the electrical and chemical industries, on account of having high electrical conductivity, corrosion resistance, and workability. 1050 alloy is also sometimes used for the manufacture of heat sinks, since it has a higher thermal conductivity than other alloys. It has low mechanical strength compared to more significantly alloyed metals. It can be strengthened by cold working, but not by heat treatment.

Alternate names and designations include Al99.5, 3.0255, and A91050. It is described in the following standards:

- ASTM B 491: Standard Specification for Aluminium and Aluminium-Alloy Extruded Round Tubes for General-Purpose Applications
- ISO 6361: Wrought Aluminium and Aluminium Alloy Sheets, Strips and Plates

== Chemical composition ==
The alloy composition of 1050 aluminium is:

- Aluminium: 99.5% min
- Copper: 0.05% max
- Iron: 0.4% max
- Magnesium: 0.05% max
- Manganese: 0.05% max
- Silicon: 0.25% max
- Titanium: 0.03% max
- Vanadium: 0.05% max
- Zinc: 0.05% max
