= 7093 aluminium alloy =

Wrought aluminium zinc alloy

7093 aluminum alloy is a wrought alloy composed of aluminum, copper, magnesium, zinc, and other elements.

== Chemical Composition ==
Properties	Value
Density	2.86 g/cc
Elements	Percentage by weight
Aluminum	84.1 - 88.4%
Copper	1.1 - 1.9%
Iron	<= 0.15%
Magnesium	2.0 - 3.0%
Nickel	0.04 - 0.16%
Other	<= 0.15%
Oxygen	0.05 - 0.50%
Silicon	<= 0.12%
Zinc	8.3 - 9.7%
Zirconium	0.08 - 0.20%
