= 7178 aluminium alloy =

Wrought aluminium zinc alloy

7178 aluminum alloy is wrought alloy. It has high zinc content. After annealing, aluminum alloy 7178 has high machinability. Resistance welding can be used.

== Chemical composition ==
The chemical composition of Aluminium / Aluminum 7178 alloy is outlined in the following table. It is difficult to cold work. Forming is hard to use for this alloy. It has high machinability.

Element	Content (%)
Aluminium / Aluminum, Al	88.1
Zinc, Zn	6.8
Magnesium, Mg	2.7
Copper, Cu	2.0
Chromium, Cr	0.26

== Properties ==
Properties	Metric
Density	2.82 g/cm3
Melting point	482 °C
Elastic modulus	70-80 GPa
Poisson's ratio	0.33
Thermal expansion	23.4 (10-6/°C)
Ultimate Tensile Strength	607 MPa
Tensile Yield Strength	538 MPa

== Designations ==
Aluminium alloy 7178 alloy can be designated as:

1. ASTM B209
2. ASTM B221
3. ASTM B241
4. ASTM B316
5. QQ A-200/13
6. QQ A-200/14
7. QQ A-250/14
8. QQ A-250/21
9. QQ A-250/28
10. QQ A-430
11. SAE J454

== Applications ==
1. Aircraft components
2. Petroleum refineries
3. Boilers
4. Heat exchangers
5. Condensers
6. Pipelines
7. Cooling towers
8. Steam exhausts
9. Electric generation plants
