= 7085 aluminium alloy =

Wrought aluminium zinc alloy

7095 aluminum alloy is wrought type alloy. It has very high zinc percentage. It also contains magnesium and copper.

== Chemical composition ==
Properties	Value
Density	2.85 g/cc
Elements	Weight Percentage (%)
Aluminum	87.62 - 90.42 %
Chromium	<= 0.04 %
Copper	1.3 - 2.0 %
Iron	<= 0.08 %
Magnesium	1.2 - 1.8 %
Manganese	<= 0.04 %
Other, each	<= 0.05 %
Other, total	<= 0.15 %
Silicon	<= 0.06 %
Titanium	<= 0.06 %
Zinc	7.0 - 8.0 %
Zirconium	0.08 - 0.15 %

== Applications ==
1. Thick plate
2. Aerospace industry
