= 7475 aluminium alloy =

Wrought aluminium zinc alloy

7475 aluminum alloy (Adirium) is a wrought alloy with high zinc weight percentage. It also contains magnesium, silicon and chromium.

7475 alloy can not be welded. It has more spring back because of its strength. It has high machinability.

== Chemical composition ==
Element	Content (%)
Aluminum	90.3
Zinc	5.7
Magnesium	2.3
Silicon	1.50
Chromium	0.22

== Properties ==
Properties	Value
Density	2.6–2.8 g/cm^{3} (0.094–0.101 lb/cu in)
Melting point	546 °C (1,015 °F)
Elastic modulus	70–80 GPa (10,000–12,000 ksi)
Poisson's ratio	0.33
Thermal conductivity	177 W/m/K (0.040 hp/ft/°R)
Ultimate Tensile Strength	531 MPa (77.0 ksi)
Elongation at Break	12%
Modulus of Elasticity	71.7 GPa (10,400 ksi)

== Applications ==
1. Shell casings
2. Aircraft
