= 7065 aluminium alloy =

Aluminum zinc alloy

7065 is high zinc containing aluminum alloy. It is used for making plate.

== Chemical Composition ==
Element	Weight percentage
Aluminum	87.02 - 89.45 %
Chromium	<= 0.04 %
Copper	1.9 - 2.3 %
Iron	<= 0.08 %
Magnesium	1.5 - 1.8 %
Manganese	<= 0.04 %
Other, each	<= 0.05 %
Other, total	<= 0.15 %
Silicon	<= 0.06 %
Titanium	<= 0.06 %
Zinc	7.1 - 8.3 %
Zirconium	0.05 - 0.15 %

== Properties ==
7065-T7451 alloy properties
Property	Value
Ultimate Tensile strength	77 ksi
Yield strength	71 ksi
Elongation percentage	11%

== Application ==
1. Plate
2. Aerospace
3. The combination of high strength and fracture toughness properties and corrosion resistance makes 7065 suitable as a replacement for 7010, 7050, 7075, 7475 and other alloys for critical intermediate thickness applications.
4. Spar, rib, and integrally machined structural parts for new, derivative, or retrofit aircraft.
