= 5083 aluminium alloy =

Weather- and industrial chemical-resistant aluminium alloy

5083 aluminium alloy is an aluminium–magnesium alloy with magnesium and traces of manganese and chromium. It is highly resistant to attack by seawater and industrial chemicals.

Alloy 5083 retains exceptional strength after welding. It has the highest strength of the non-heat treatable alloys with an Ultimate Tensile Strength of 317 MPa or 46000 psi and a Tensile Yield Strength of 228 MPa or 33000 psi. It is not recommended for use in temperatures in excess of 65 °C. Alloy 5083 is also commonly used in cryogenic applications due to it being able to be cooled to −195 °C. At this temperature, the alloy has an increase in ultimate tensile strength of 40% and in yield strength of 10% as well as exhibiting excellent fracture toughness at such temperatures.

== Anodizing ==
For AA 5083 alloy, the stages of porous structure development are substantially identical with that of pure aluminium, although an increase in oxide growth rate and high conductance of the oxide film were observed.

== Chemical composition ==
The composition of 5083 aluminium is:

- Aluminium: balance (92.55-95.55%)
- Chromium: 0.05-0.25% max
- Copper: 0.1% max
- Iron: 0.4% max
- Magnesium: 4.0 to 4.9%
- Manganese: 0.4 to 1.0%
- Silicon: 0.4% max
- Titanium: 0.15% max
- Zinc: 0.25% max

== Applications ==
Alloy 5083 is commonly used in:

- Shipbuilding
- Railroad cars
- Drilling rigs
- Coachwork
- Pressure vessels
- Vehicle armour
- Cryogenics

Use requiring a weldable moderate-strength alloy having good corrosion resistance is met by alloy 5083.

== See also ==
- Hydronalium
