= 7034 aluminium alloy =

Wrought aluminium zinc alloy

7034 aluminium alloy is a wrought type. It having a very high ultimate tensile strength of 750 MPa.

== Chemical Composition ==
Element	Composition
Aluminum, Al	82.6 - 86.1%
Chromium, Cr	<= 0.20%
Copper, Cu	0.80 - 1.2%
Iron, Fe	<= 0.12%
Magnesium, Mg	2.0 - 3.0%
Manganese, Mn	<= 0.25%
Other, each	<= 0.05%
Other, total	<= 0.15%
Silicon, Si	<= 0.10%
Zinc, Zn	11 - 12%
Zirconium, Zr	0.08 - 0.30%

== Properties ==
Physical Properties	SI Unit
Density	2.89 g/cc
Mechanical Properties	Metric
Brinell Hardness	210
Ultimate Tensile Strength	750 MPa
Yield Strength	730 MPa
Elongation at Yield	8.0 %
Youngs Modulus	71.0 GPa
Thermal Properties	Metric
Coefficient of thermal expansion	23.0 μm/m-°C
Thermal Conductivity	130 W/m-K
