= 7129 aluminium alloy =

Aluminium zinc alloy

Aluminium 7129 alloy is a heat treatable wrought alloy.

== Chemical composition ==
Element	Weight Percentage (%)
Aluminum	90.9 - 94
Zinc	4.2 - 5.2
Magnesium	1.3 - 2
Copper	0.50 - 0.90
Iron	≤ 0.30
Titanium	≤ 0.050
Vanadium	≤ 0.050
Gallium	≤ 0.030
Silicon	≤ 0.15
Chromium	≤ 0.10
Manganese	≤ 0.10
Remainder (each)	≤ 0.050
Remainder (total)	≤ 0.15

== Properties ==
Properties	Metric
Density	2.78 g/cm^{3}
Youngs modulus	69 GPa
Elongation at Break	9.0 % to 9.1 %
Fatigue Strength	150 to 190 MPa
Shear Modulus	26 GPa
Shear Strength	250 to 260 MPa
Tensile Strength: Ultimate (UTS)	430 MPa
Specific Heat Capacity	880 J/kg-K
Thermal Conductivity	150 W/m-K

== Applications ==
1. Aircraft manufacturing sector
