= 7050 aluminium alloy =

Aluminium zinc alloy

Aluminium 7050 alloy is a heat treatable alloy. It has high toughness, high strength. It has high stress corrosion cracking resistance. It has electric conductivity of value having 40 percent of copper. 7050 aluminium is known as a commercial aerospace alloy.

== Chemical Composition ==
Element	Content (weight %)
Aluminum, Al	89
Copper, Cu	2.3
Magnesium, Mg	2.3
Zinc, Zn	6.2
Zirconium, Zr	0.12

== Physical Properties ==
Properties	Metric
Density	2.6-2.8 g/cm3
Melting point	494°C
Tensile strength	515 MPa
Yield strength	455 MPa
Fatigue strength	150 MPa
Elastic modulus	70-80 GPa
Poisson's ratio	0.33
Elongation	11%
Thermal conductivity	180 W/mK

== Designations ==
It can be written as:

1. AMS 4108
2. AMS 4201
3. ASTM B247
4. ASTM B316
5. QQ A-430

== Welding ==
Welding should be avoided, because it weakens aluminum alloy.

== Applications ==
1. Aircraft and other structures
2. Fuselage frames
3. Bulkheads
4. Wing skins
5. Military aircraft applications
