= 7255 aluminium alloy =

Wrought aluminium zinc alloy

7255 aluminium alloy is a wrought alloy with high zinc weight percentage (from 7.8 to 8.4%). It also contains magnesium, copper.

== Chemical composition ==
Elements	Weight Percentage
Aluminum	86.1 - 88.52%
Zinc	7.6 - 8.4%
Copper	2.0 - 2.6%
Magnesium	1.8 - 2.3%
Zirconium	0.08 - 0.15%
Titanium	<= 0.06%
Iron	<= 0.09%
Chromium	<= 0.04%
Manganese	<= 0.05%
Other, each	<= 0.05%
Other, total	<= 0.15%
Silicon	<= 0.06%

== Properties ==
7255 aluminium alloy properties
Properties	SI Unit Value
Density	2.86 g/cc
