= 7116 aluminium alloy =

Wrought aluminium zinc alloy

Aluminium 7116 alloy is heat treatable wrought alloy. It has 4.2 to 5.2 weight percentage of Zinc. It also contains magnesium, copper as small additions.

== Chemical composition ==
Element	Weight Percentage (%)
Aluminum	91.5 - 94.5
Zinc	4.2 - 5.2
Magnesium	0.80 - 1.4
Copper	0.50 - 1.1
Iron	≤ 0.30
Silicon	≤ 0.15
Titanium	≤ 0.050
Vanadium	≤ 0.050
Manganese	≤ 0.050
Gallium	≤ 0.030
Other (each)	≤ 0.050
Other (total)	≤ 0.15

== Properties ==
Properties	Metric
Density	2.78 g/cm^{3}
Young's Modulus	69 MPa
Elongation at Break	7.8%
Fatigue Strength	160 MPa
Poisson's Ratio	0.33
Ultimate Tensile Strength	370 MPa
Yield Strength	330 MPa
Specific Heat Capacity	880 J/kg-K
Thermal Conductivity	150 W/m-K

== Applications ==
7116 Aluminium alloy is primarily used in the aviation industry.
