= 7039 aluminium alloy =

Wrought aluminium zinc alloy

AA 7039 is an aluminum alloy principally containing zinc (3.5–4.5%) as an alloying element. It is heat treatable wrought aluminum alloy. It is used for making armour suites.

== Chemical Composition ==
No	Element	Content (%)
1	Aluminum, Al	Remainder
2	Zinc, Zn	3.5 - 4.5
3	Magnesium, Mg	2.3 - 3.3
4	Silicon, Si	0.3 max
5	Iron, Fe	0.4 max
6	Chromium, Cr	0.15 - 0.25
7	Manganese, Mn	0.1 - 0.4
8	Copper, Cu	0.1 max
9	Titanium, Ti	0.1 max
10	Remainder (total)	0.15 max

== Physical Properties ==
No	Properties	Metric
1	Density	2.74 g/cm^{3}
2	Melting point	482-638°C

== Mechanical Properties ==
No	Properties	Metric
1	Tensile strength	450 MPa
2	Yield strength	380 MPa
3	Elongation at break	13%
4	Elastic modulus	69.6 GPa
5	Shear strength	255 MPa

=== For more properties, visit ===
1. Aluminum 7039-T61 Properties
2. Aluminum 7039-T64 Properties

== Applications ==
Aluminium 7039 alloy is chiefly used as an armor alloy. It is used for making armor suite.
