= 4043 aluminium alloy =

Aluminium silicon alloy

4043 aluminium alloy is a wrought aluminium alloy with good corrosion resistance typically used as filler material for welding of aluminium parts. It contains high amounts of silicon (between 4.5 and 6%) and trace amounts of other metals. It is grey in appearance and is sold as either welding wire or welding rod for TIG/MIG processes.

== Chemical composition ==
Aluminium is the remainder.

Element	Percentage (%)
Silicon (Si)	4.5-6.0
Iron (Fe)	0.80
Copper (Cu)	0.30
Manganese (Mn)	0.05
Magnesium (Mg)	0.05
Zinc (Zn)	0.10
Titanium (Ti)	0.20
Beryllium (Be)	0.0003
