= Unified numbering system =

Metal alloy designation system

The Unified Numbering System for Metals and Alloys (UNS) is an alloy designation system widely accepted in North America. Each UNS number relates to a specific metal or alloy and defines its specific chemical composition, or in some cases a specific mechanical or physical property. A UNS number alone does not constitute a full material specification because it establishes no requirements for material properties, heat treatment, form, or quality.

== History ==
During the early 20th century many different metal alloys were developed in isolation within certain industries to meet the needs of that industry. This allowed a wide variety of competing standards, compositions and designations to flourish. By the 1960s there were a number of differing numbering or designation schemes for various alloys. This meant that the same number might be used for different alloys, different numbers might be used for the same alloy or different trade names might indicate similar or wildly different alloys. Additionally, the increasing number of new alloys meant that the problem would only get worse.

In January 1971, an 18-month study recommended that a unified system would be possible and helpful. An advisory board was established in April 1972 to establish the Unified Numbering System (UNS). The UNS is managed jointly by the ASTM International and SAE International. The resulting document SAE HS-1086 provides a cross-reference between various designation systems and the chemical composition.

== UNS number vs material specification ==
A UNS number only defines a specific chemical composition, it does not provide full material specification. Requirements such as material properties (yield strength, ultimate strength, hardness, etc.), heat treatment, form (rolled, cast, forged, flanges, tubes, bars, etc.), purpose (high temperature, boilers and pressure vessels, etc.) and testing methods are all specified in the material or standard specification which is created by various trade and professional organizations. Many material or standard specifications include a number of different UNS numbers that may be used within that specification.

For example: UNS S30400 (SAE 304, Cr/Ni 18/10, Euronorm 1.4301 stainless steel) could be used to make stainless steel bars (ASTM A276) or stainless steel plates for pressure vessels (ASTM A240) or pipes (ASTM A312). Conversely, A312 pipes could be made out of about 70 different UNS alloy steels.

== Format ==
It consists of a prefix letter and five digits designating a material composition. For example, a prefix of S indicates stainless steel alloys, C indicates copper, brass, or bronze alloys, T indicates tool steels, and so on. The first 3 digits often match older 3-digit numbering systems, while the last 2 digits indicate more modern variations.

For example, Stainless Steel Type 310 in the original 3-digit system became S31000 in the UNS System. The more modern low-carbon variation, Type 310S, became S31008 in the UNS System. Often, the suffix digit is chosen to represent a material property specification. For example, "08" was assigned to UNS S31008 because the maximum allowed carbon content is 0.08%.

UNS categories
UNS series	Metal type(s)
A00001 to A99999	Aluminum and aluminum alloys
C00001 to C99999	Copper and copper alloys (brasses and bronzes)
D00001 to D99999	Specified mechanical property steels
E00001 to E99999	Rare earth and rare earthlike metals and alloys
F00001 to F99999	Cast irons
G00001 to G99999	AISI and SAE carbon and alloy steels (except tool steels)
H00001 to H99999	AISI and SAE H-steels
J00001 to J99999	Cast steels (except tool steels)
K00001 to K99999	Miscellaneous steels and ferrous alloys
L00001 to L99999	Low-melting metals and alloys
M00001 to M99999	Miscellaneous nonferrous metals and alloys eg M1xxxx - Magnesium Alloys
N00001 to N99999	Nickel and nickel alloys
P00001 to P99999	Precious metals and alloys
R00001 to R99999	Refractory metals and alloys eg R03xxx- Molybdenum Alloys R04xxx- Niobium (Columbium) Alloys R05xxx- Tantalum Alloys R3xxxx- Cobalt Alloys R5xxxx- Titanium Alloys R6xxxx- Zirconium Alloys
S00001 to S99999	Heat and corrosion resistant (stainless) steels
T00001 to T99999	Tool steels, wrought and cast
W00001 to W99999	Welding filler metals
Z00001 to Z99999	Zinc and zinc alloys

== Example materials ==
Some common materials and translations to other standards:

- UNS K11547 is T2 tool steel
- UNS S17400 is ASTM grade 630, Cr-Ni 17-4PH precipitation hardened stainless steel
- UNS S30400 is SAE 304, Cr/Ni 18/10, Euronorm 1.4301 stainless steel
- UNS S31600 is SAE 316
- UNS S31603 is 316L, a low carbon version of 316. The digits "03" were assigned since the maximum allowed carbon content is 0.03%
- UNS C90300 is CDA 903

== Chinese variant ==
A UNS-derived system known as ISC (in Chinese 统一数字代号, literally "unified numeric designator") is used in China in parallel to the composition-based nomenclature. Individual grades may receive the same number (e.g. S31603), a slightly different number (e.g. S30400/S30408, S17400/S17440), or a totally different one (e.g. S20200/S35450, S41026/S45710).

== See also ==
- Steel grades
- SAE steel grades
