= Aluminium–copper alloys =

Aluminium–copper alloys (AlCu) are aluminium alloys that consist largely of aluminium (Al) and a small percentage of copper (Cu) as the main alloying elements. Important variants also contain additives of magnesium, iron, nickel and/or silicon (AlCu(Mg, Fe, Ni, Si)). Often manganese is also included to increase strength (see aluminium–manganese alloys). The main area of application is aircraft construction. The alloys have medium to high strength and can be age hardened. There are both wrought alloys and cast alloys. The susceptibility of these alloys to corrosion and their poor weldability are disadvantages.

Duralumin is the oldest variety in this group and goes back to Alfred Wilm, who discovered it in 1903. Aluminium could only be used as a widespread construction material thanks to the aluminium–copper alloys, as pure aluminium is much too soft for this and other hardenable alloys such as aluminium–magnesium–silicon alloys (AlMgSi) or the naturally hard (non-hardenable) alloys.

Aluminium–copper alloys were standardised in the 2000 series by the international alloy designation system (IADS) which was originally created in 1970 by The Aluminum Association. The 2000 series includes 2014 and 2024 alloys used in airframe fabrication.

Copper alloys with aluminium as the main alloying metal are known as aluminium bronze, the amount of aluminium is generally less than 12%.

== History ==
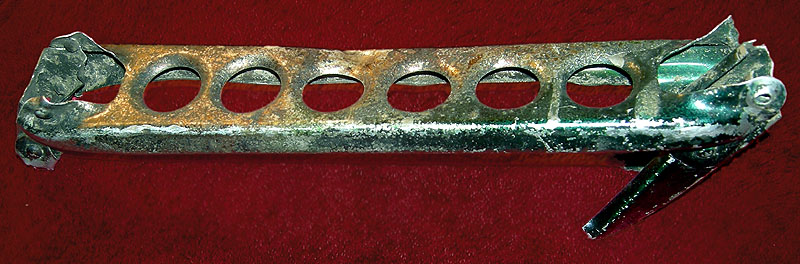
Fire-damaged Duralumin cross brace from the Zeppelin airship Hindenburg (DLZ129) salvaged from its crash site at Lakehurst Maxfield Field, NJ on May 6, 1937

Duralumin is a trade name for one of the earliest types of age-hardenable aluminium alloys. The term is a combination of Dürener and aluminium. Its use as a trade name is obsolete. Duralumin was developed by the German metallurgist Alfred Wilm at Dürener Metallwerke AG. In 1903, Wilm discovered that after quenching, an aluminium alloy containing 4% copper would harden when left at room temperature for several days. Further improvements led to the introduction of duralumin in 1909. The name is mainly used in pop-science to describe all Al–Cu alloys system.

Aluminium–copper alloys were standardised in the 2000 series by the international alloy designation system (IADS) which was originally created in 1970 by the Aluminum Association. 2000s series includes 2014 and 2024 alloys used in airframe fabrication.

== Pure AlCu wrought alloys ==
Section of the alloy phase diagram relevant for technically used alloys

All AlCu alloys are based on the system of pure AlCu alloys.

=== Solubility of copper and phases ===
Aluminium forms a eutectic with copper at 547 °C and 33 mass percent copper, which also corresponds to the maximum solubility. At lower temperatures, the solubility drops sharply; at room temperature it is only 0.1%.

At higher copper contents, Al_{2}Cu is formed, an intermetallic phase. It is present in a tetragonal structure, which is so different from the cubic crystal system of aluminium that the $\theta$-phase exists only as an incoherent phase. There are also the partially coherent ones $\theta''$- and $\theta'$-phases.

=== Microstructural transformations ===
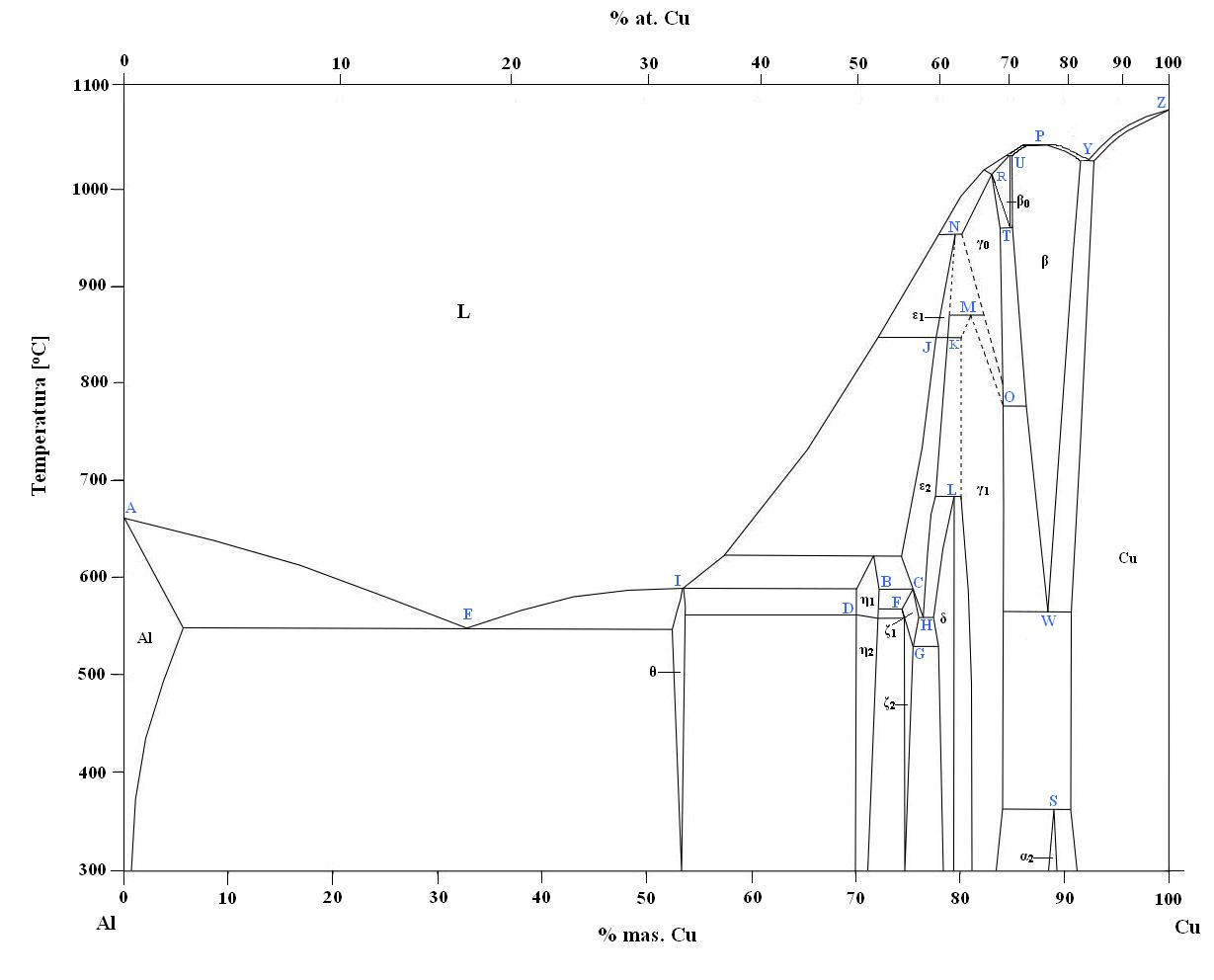
Complete alloy phase diagram

After casting, the material is usually oversaturated – mixed crystal, which also contains more copper at room temperature than could actually be dissolved at this temperature.

- After that, GP zones (GP(I) zones) form at temperatures below 80 °C, in which increased concentrations of copper are present, but which do not yet have a structure or form their own phases.
- At somewhat higher temperatures of up to 250 °C, this forms $\theta''$-phase (also called GP(II) zones), which increases strength.
- At even higher temperatures, the partially coherent forms $\theta'$-Phase.
- At still higher temperatures of about 300 °C the incoherent one forms $\theta$-phase in which the strength decreases again.

The individual temperature ranges overlap: Even at low temperatures, there is formation of $\theta'$- or $\theta$ phases, but these form much more slowly than the GP(I/II) zones. Each of the phases forms faster the higher the temperature.

==== GP(I) zones ====
The formation of GP(I) zones is referred to as natural hardening and occurs at temperatures up to 80 °C. They are tiny disc-shaped layers just one atom thick and 2 to 5 nanometers in diameter. With time, the number of zones increases and the copper concentration in them increases, but not their diameter. They are coherent with the aluminum lattice and form on the {100} planes.

==== GP(II) zones ====
The GP(II) zones ($\theta''$-phases) are largely responsible for the increase in strength of the AlCu alloys. They are coherent with the aluminium crystal and consist of alternating layers of aluminium and copper with layer thicknesses of about 10 nanometers and dimensions of up to 150 nanometers. In contrast to the GP(I) zones, these are three-dimensional precipitations. Their layers are parallel to the aluminium {100} plane. From the $\theta''$-phase forms the $\theta'$-phases, but there are overlaps.

The GP(II) zones need vacancies for growth, which is why a lack of these (e.g. due to magnesium) leads to delayed growth.

==== Partially coherent phases ====
The $\theta'$-phase is only partially coherent with the aluminium lattice and forms at temperatures from 150 °C to 300 °C. It has the form of platelets and can arise from the GP(II) zones. However, it can also arise directly as a precipitation from the mixed crystal. In the first case, the increasing surface tension is reduced by dislocations, in the second case, the precipitates form preferentially at dislocations.

==== Incoherent phases ====
The $\theta$-phase is incoherent with the lattice of the mixed crystal. It forms at temperatures of 300 °C and more. It usually forms larger particles with a larger spacing than the other phases and thus does not lead to any increase in strength or even to a drop if its formation takes place at the expense of the other phases. The $\theta$-phase also occurs at temperatures between 150 °C and 250 °C as precipitation at grain boundaries, as this reduces the surface tension.

The $\theta$-phase leads to a partial intergranular fracture; however, the fracture behavior remains ductile overall. The change in fracture behavior is caused by precipitation-free zones at the grain boundaries.

The $\theta$-phase has a greater potential difference compared to the mixed crystal, so that layer corrosion and intergranular corrosion can occur. With longer annealing times, the inside of the grains also separate the $\theta$-phases, the potential difference is additionally lower.

== Grades, alloying elements and contents ==
As with almost all aluminium alloys, a distinction is made between wrought alloys for rolling and forging and cast alloys for casting.

The copper content is usually between 3 and 6%. Between 0.3% and 6% the alloys are regarded as not weldable or very difficult to weld (by fusion welding), with higher copper contents they become weldable again. Most types also contain additives of magnesium, manganese and silicon to increase strength. Lead and bismuth form small inclusions that melt at low temperatures, resulting in better chip formation, similar to free machining steel. The heat resistance is increased by adding nickel and iron.

Iron, is found as an impurity in engineering alloys, preventing strain hardening, but adding magnesium makes the aforementioned process possible again. Larger amounts of magnesium up to 1.5% increase strength and elongation at break (see Aluminium-magnesium alloy). Manganese is also used to increase strength (see AlMn). Larger amounts, however, have negative side effects, so the content is limited to around 1% manganese. Smaller additions of silicon are added to bind iron, since it prefers to form the AlFeSi phase, while the formation of Al_{7}Cu_{2}Fe would remove larger amounts of copper from the material, which then no longer leads to the formation of phases that are actually desired (especially Al_{2}Cu, copper aluminide). Larger amounts of silicon are alloyed to form with magnesium Mg_{2}Si (magnesium silicide) which, like aluminium-magnesium-silicon alloy, improves strength and hardenability.

Lithium is added to some alloys with contents between 1.5% and 2.5%. Due to the very low density of Li (0.53 g/cm^{3} compared to 2.7 g/cm^{3} of aluminium), this leads to lighter components, which is particularly advantageous in aviation. See aluminium-lithium alloy for details.

=== Cast alloys ===
Cast alloys contain about 4% copper and small amounts of other additives that improve castability, including titanium and magnesium. The starting material is primary aluminium; in contrast to other cast aluminium alloys, secondary aluminium (made from scrap) is not used because it reduces elongation and toughness at break. The AlCu cast alloys are prone to hot cracking and are used in the T4 and T6 hardening states.

The following table shows the composition of some grades according to DIN EN 1706. All data is shown in percent by mass, the rest of the materials is aluminium.

number	Chemical (CEN designation)	silicon	iron	copper	manganese	magnesium	zinc	titanium
21000	AlCu4TiMg	0.2	0.4	4.2–5.0	0.10	0.15–0.35	0.1	0.15–0.30
21100	AlCu4Ti	0.18	0.19	4.2–5.2	0.55	–	0.07	0.15–0.30

=== Wrought alloys ===
number	Chemical (CENdesignation)	silicon	iron	copper	manganese	magnesium	chrome	zinc	titanium	Other
EN AW-2007	AlCu4PbMgMn	0.8	0.8	3.3–4.6	0.50–1.0	0.4–1.8	0.10	0.8	0.20	0.20 Bi 0.8–1.5 Pb 0.2 Sn 0.2 Ni
EN AW-2011	AlCu6BiPb	0.40	0.7	5.0–6.0	–	–	–	0.30	–	0.20–0.6 Bi 0.2–0.6 Pb
EN AW-2014 (EN AW-2014A)	AlCu4SiMg AlCu4MgSi(A)	0.5–1.2 (0.5–0.9)	0.7 (0.5)	3.9–5.0	0.40–1.2	0.20–0.8	0.10	0.25	0.15	0.2 Zr+Ti (0.2 (Zr+Ti), 0.10 Ni)
EN AW-2017	AlCu4MgSi(A)	0.2–0.8	0.7	3.5–4.5	0.4–1.0	0.4–1.0	0.10	0.25	–	0.25Zr+Ti
EN AW-2024	AlCu4Mg1	0.50	0.5	3.8–4.9	0.30–0.9	1.2–1.8	0.10	0.25	0.15	0.2Zr+Ti
AA 2026	AlCu4Mg1Zr	0.05	0.07	3.6–4.3	0.30–0.8	1.0–1.6	–	0.10	0.06	0.05–0.25 zr

=== AlCuMg(Si,Mn) wrought alloys ===
The AlCuMg alloys represent the most important group of AlCu alloys. Many other phases can form in them:

- Al_{8} Mg_{5} ($\theta$-phase, see AlMg)
- Al_{2} CuMg, the S phase
- Al_{6} Mg_{4} Cu, the T phase

The addition of magnesium accelerates the process of cold hardening. Which phases are formed depends primarily on the ratio of copper to magnesium. If the ratio is less than 1/1, clusters containing Cu and Mg are eliminated. At a ratio above 1.5/1, which is the case with most engineering alloys, the forms preferentially phase. These kinds of alloys have significantly higher hardness and strength.

== Mechanical properties ==
Conditions:

- O soft (soft-annealed, also hot-formed with the same strength limit values)
- T3: solution annealed, quenched, work hardened and naturally aged
- T4: solution annealed, quenched and artificially aged
- T6: solution heat treated, quenched and artificially aged
- T8: solution annealed, cold worked and artificially aged

Numeric	Chemical (CEN)	Condition	Elastic modulus /MPa	Shear modulus /MPa	Yield strength /MPa	Tensile strength /MPa	Elongation at break /%
EN AW-2007	AlCu4PbMgMn	T3; T8	72,500	27,300	300; 310	380; 405	16; 14
EN AW-2011	AlCu6BiPb	T3; T4; T6; T8	72,500	27,300	290; 270; 300; 315	365; 350; 395; 420	15; 18; 12; 13
EN AW-2014	AlCu4Mg	0; T4; T6	73,000	27,400	85; 275; 425	190; 430; 485	20; 18; 12
EN AW-2017A	AlCu4MgSi(A)	0; T4	72,500	27,200	70; 275	180; 425	20; 21
EN AW-2024	AlCu4Mg1	0; T8	73,000	27,400	75; 450	185; 485	20; nb

== 2000 series ==
2000 series was formerly referred to as duralumin.

2000 series aluminium alloy nominal composition (% weight) and applications
Alloy	Al contents	Alloying elements	Uses and refs
2004	93.6	Cu 6.0; Zr 0.4	Aerospace
2011	93.7	Cu 5.5; Bi 0.4; Pb 0.4	Universal
2014	93.5	Cu 4.4; Si 0.8; Mn 0.8; Mg 0.5	Universal
2017	94.2	Cu 4.0; Si 0.5; Mn 0.7; Mg 0.6	Aerospace
2020	93.4	Cu 4.5; Li 1.3; Mn 0.55; Cd 0.25	Aerospace
2024	93.5	Cu 4.4; Mn 0.6; Mg 1.5	Universal, aerospace
2029	94.6	Cu 3.6; Mn 0.3; Mg 1.0; Ag 0.4; Zr 0.1	Alclad sheet, aerospace
2036	96.7	Cu 2.6; Mn 0.25; Mg 0.45	Sheet
2048	94.8	Cu 3.3; Mn 0.4; Mg 1.5	Sheet, plate
2055	93.5	Cu 3.7; Zn 0.5; Li 1.1; Ag 0.4;Mn 0.2; Mg 0.3; Zr 0.1	Aerospace extrusions,
2080	94.0	Mg 3.7; Zn 1.85; Cr 0.2; Li 0.2	Aerospace
2090	95.0	Cu 2.7; Li 2.2; Zr 0.12	Aerospace
2091	94.3	Cu 2.1; Li 2.0; Mg 1.5; Zr 0.1	Aerospace, cryogenics
2094		Si 0.12; Fe 0.15; Cu 4.4–5.2; Mn 0.25; Mg 0.25–0.8; Zn 0.25; Ti 0.10; Ag 0.25–0.6; Li 0.7–1.4; Zr 0.04–0.18	
2095	93.6	Cu 4.2; Li 1.3; Mg 0.4; Ag 0.4; Zr 0.1	Aerospace
2097		Si 0.12; Fe 0.15; Cu 2.5–3.1; Mn 0.10–0.6; Mg 0.35; Zn 0.35; Ti 0.15; Li 1.2–1.8; Zr 0.08–0.15	
2098		Si 0.12; Fe 0.15; Cu 2.3–3.8; Mn 0.35; Mg 0.25–0.8; Zn 0.35; Ti 0.10; Ag 0.25–0.6; Li 2.4–2.8; Zr 0.04–0.18	
2099	94.3	Cu 2.53; Mn 0.3; Mg 0.25; Li 1.75; Zn 0.75; Zr 0.09	Aerospace
2124	93.5	Cu 4.4; Mn 0.6; Mg 1.5	Plate
2195	93.5	Cu 4.0; Mn 0.5; Mg 0.45; Li 1.0; Ag 0.4; Zr 0.12	Aerospace, Space Shuttle Super Lightweight external tank, and the SpaceX Falcon 9 and Falcon 1e second stage launch vehicles.
2196		Si 0.12; Fe 0.15; Cu 2.5–3.3; Mn 0.35; Mg 0.25–0.8; Zn 0.35; Ti 0.10; Ag 0.25–0.6; Li 1.4–2.1; Zr 0.08–0.16	Extrusion
2197		Si 0.10; Fe 0.10; Cu 2.5–3.1; Mn 0.10–0.50; Mg 0.25; Zn 0.05; Ti 0.12; Li 1.3–1.7; Zr 0.08–0.15	
2198			Sheet
2218	92.2	Cu 4.0; Mg 1.5; Fe 1.0; Si 0.9; Zn 0.25; Mn 0.2	Forgings, aircraft engine cylinders
2219	93.0	Cu 6.3; Mn 0.3;Ti 0.06; V 0.1; Zr 0.18	Universal, Space Shuttle Standard Weight external tank
2297		Si 0.10; Fe 0.10; Cu 2.5–3.1; Mn 0.10–0.50; Mg 0.25; Zn 0.05; Ti 0.12; Li 1.1–1.7; Zr 0.08–0.15	
2397		Si 0.10; Fe 0.10; Cu 2.5–3.1; Mn 0.10–0.50; Mg 0.25; Zn 0.05–0.15; Ti 0.12; Li 1.1–1.7; Zr 0.08–0.15	
2224&2324	93.8	Cu 4.1; Mn 0.6; Mg 1.5	Plate
2319	93.0	Cu 6.3; Mn 0.3; Ti 0.15; V 0.1; Zr 0.18	Bar and wire
2519	93.0	Cu 5.8; Mg 0.2; Ti 0.15; V 0.1; Zr 0.2	Aerospace armour plate
2524	93.8	Cu 4.2; Mn 0.6; Mg 1.4	Plate, sheet
2618	93.7	Cu 2.3; Si 0.18; Mg 1.6; Ti 0.07; Fe 1.1; Ni 1.0	Forgings

== Applications ==
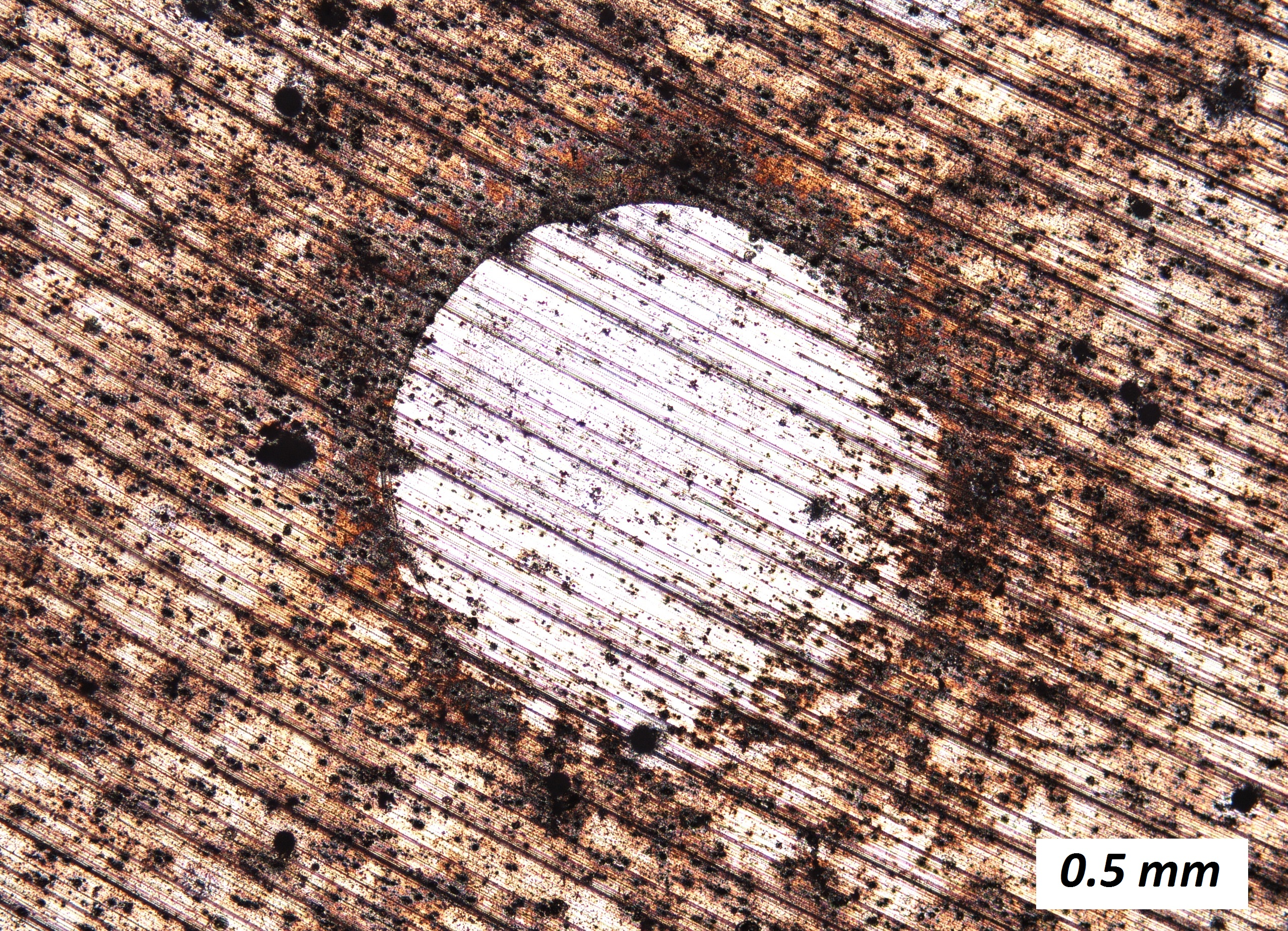
Corrosion of duralumin

Aluminium–copper alloys are mainly used in aircraft construction, where their low corrosion resistance plays a subordinate role. Corrosion resistance can be greatly enhanced by the metallurgical bonding of a high-purity aluminium surface layer, referred to as alclad-duralum. To this day alclad materials are used commonly in the aircraft industry. The alloys are processed by rolling, forging, extrusion and partly by casting. Typical uses for wrought Al–Cu alloys include:

- 2011: Wire, rod, and bar for automatic lathe products. Applications where good machinability and good strength are required.
- 2014: Heavy-duty forgings, plate, and extrusions for aircraft fittings, wheels, and major structural components, space booster tankage and structure, truck frame and suspension components. Applications requiring high strength and hardness including service at elevated temperatures.
- 2017 or Avional (France): Around 1% Si. Good machinability. Acceptable resistance to corrosion in air and mechanical properties. Also called AU4G in France. Used for aircraft applications between the wars in France and Italy. Also saw some use in motor-racing applications from the 1960s, as it is a tolerant alloy that could be press-formed with relatively unsophisticated equipment.
- 2024: Aircraft structures, rivets, hardware, truck wheels, screw machine products, and other structural applications.
- 2036: Sheet for auto body panels
- 2048: Sheet and plate in structural components for aerospace application and military equipment

=== Aviation ===
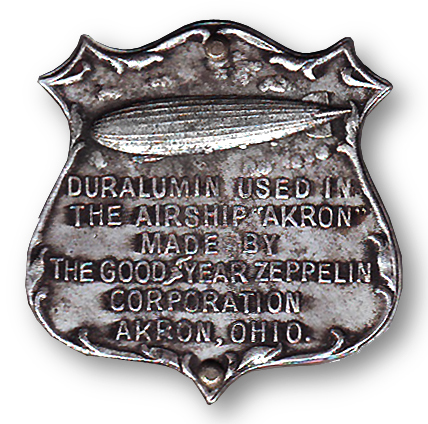
Duralumin sample from the 1931 airship USS Akron (ZRS-4)

German scientific literature openly published information about duralumin, its composition and heat treatment, before the outbreak of World War I in 1914. Despite this, use of the alloy outside Germany did not occur until after fighting ended in 1918. Reports of German use during World War I, even in technical journals such as Flight International, could still misidentify its key alloying component as magnesium rather than copper. Engineers in the UK showed little interest in duralumin only until after the war.

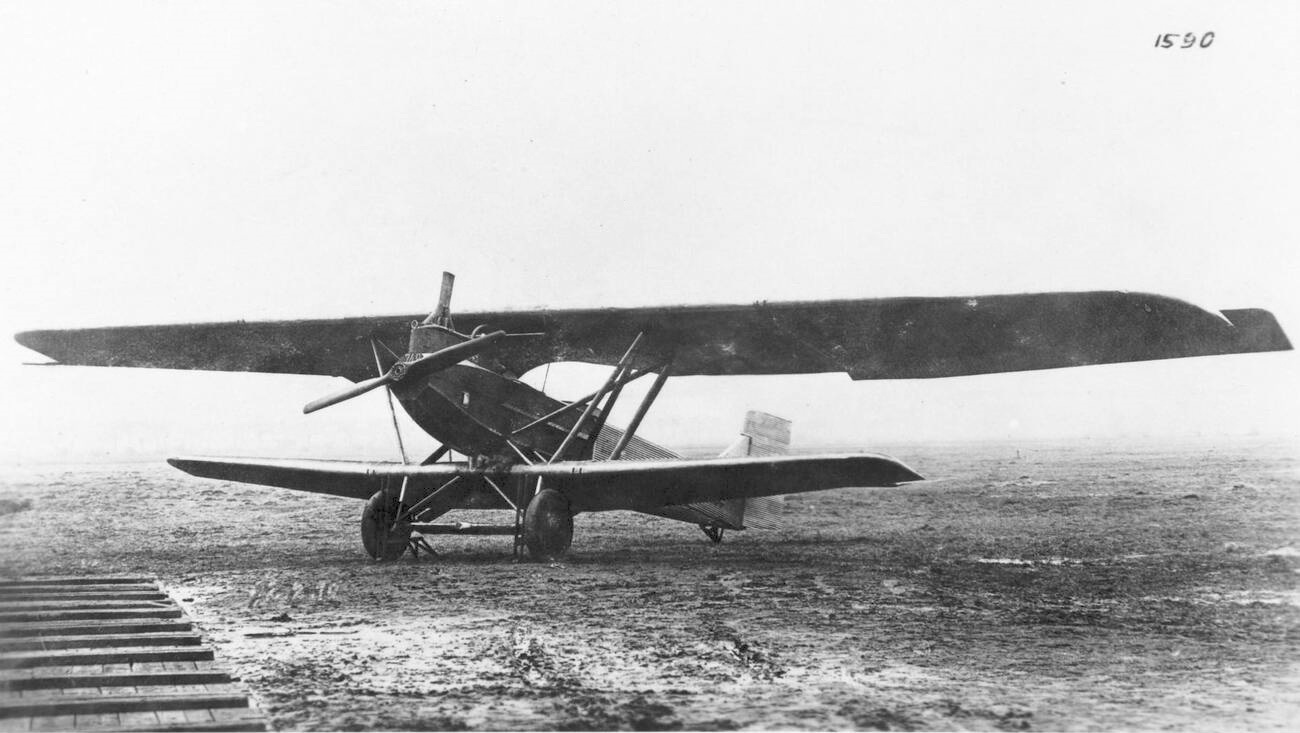
The first mass-production aircraft to make extensive use of duralumin, the armored Junkers J.I biplane of World War I

The earliest known attempt to use duralumin for a heavier-than-air aircraft structure occurred in 1916, when Hugo Junkers first introduced its use in the airframe of the Junkers J 3, a single-engined monoplane "technology demonstrator" that marked the first use of the Junkers trademark duralumin corrugated skinning. The Junkers company completed only the covered wings and tubular fuselage framework of the J 3 before abandoning its development. The slightly later, solely IdFlieg-designated Junkers J.I armoured sesquiplane of 1917, known to the factory as the Junkers J 4, had its all-metal wings and horizontal stabilizer made in the same manner as the J 3's wings had been, like the experimental and airworthy all-duralumin Junkers J 7 single-seat fighter design, which led to the Junkers D.I low-wing monoplane fighter, introducing all-duralumin aircraft structural technology to German military aviation in 1918.

Its first use in aerostatic airframes came in rigid airship frames, eventually including all those of the "Great Airship" era of the 1920s and 1930s: the British-built R-100, the German passenger Zeppelins LZ 127 Graf Zeppelin, LZ 129 Hindenburg, LZ 130 Graf Zeppelin II, and the U.S. Navy airships USS Los Angeles (ZR-3, ex-LZ 126), USS Akron (ZRS-4) and USS Macon (ZRS-5).

2000 series were once the most common aerospace alloys, but because they were susceptible to stress corrosion cracking, they are increasingly being replaced by 7000 series in new designs.

=== Bicycle ===
Duralumin was used to manufacture bicycle components and framesets from the 1930s to 1990s. Several companies in Saint-Étienne, France stood out for their early, innovative adoption of duralumin: in 1932, Verot et Perrin developed the first light alloy crank arms; in 1934, Haubtmann released a complete crankset; from 1935 on, Duralumin freewheels, derailleurs, pedals, brakes and handlebars were manufactured by several companies.

Complete framesets followed quickly, including those manufactured by: Mercier (and Aviac and other licensees) with their popular Meca Dural family of models, the Pelissier brothers and their race-worthy La Perle models, and Nicolas Barra and his mid-twentieth century "Barralumin" creations. Other names that come up here also included: Pierre Caminade, with his Caminargent creations and their octagonal tubing, and also Gnome et Rhône, with its deep heritage as an aircraft engine manufacturer that also diversified into motorcycles, velomotors and bicycles after World War Two.

Mitsubishi Heavy Industries, which was prohibited from producing aircraft during the American occupation of Japan, manufactured the "cross" bicycle out of surplus wartime duralumin in 1946. The "cross" was designed by Kiro Honjo, a former aircraft designer responsible for the Mitsubishi G4M.

Duralumin use in bicycle manufacturing faded in the 1970s and 1980s. Vitus (bicycle company) nonetheless released the venerable "979" frameset in 1979, a "Duralinox" model that became an instant classic among cyclists. The Vitus 979 was the first production aluminium frameset whose thin-wall 5083/5086 tubing was slip-fit and then glued together using a dry heat-activated epoxy. The result was an extremely lightweight but very durable frameset. Production of the Vitus 979 continued until 1992.
