= Duralumin =

Trade name of age-hardenable aluminium alloy

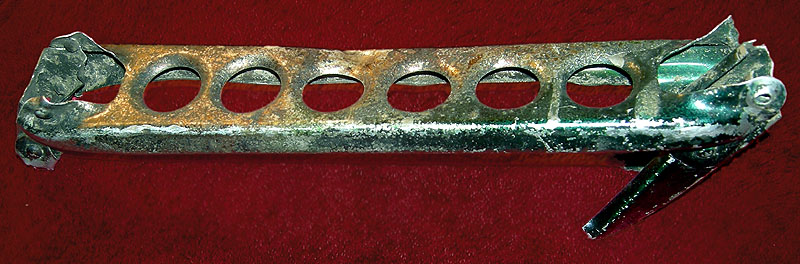
Fire-damaged Duralumin cross brace from the Zeppelin airship Hindenburg (DLZ129) salvaged from its crash site at Lakehurst Naval Air Station, New Jersey, on May 6, 1937

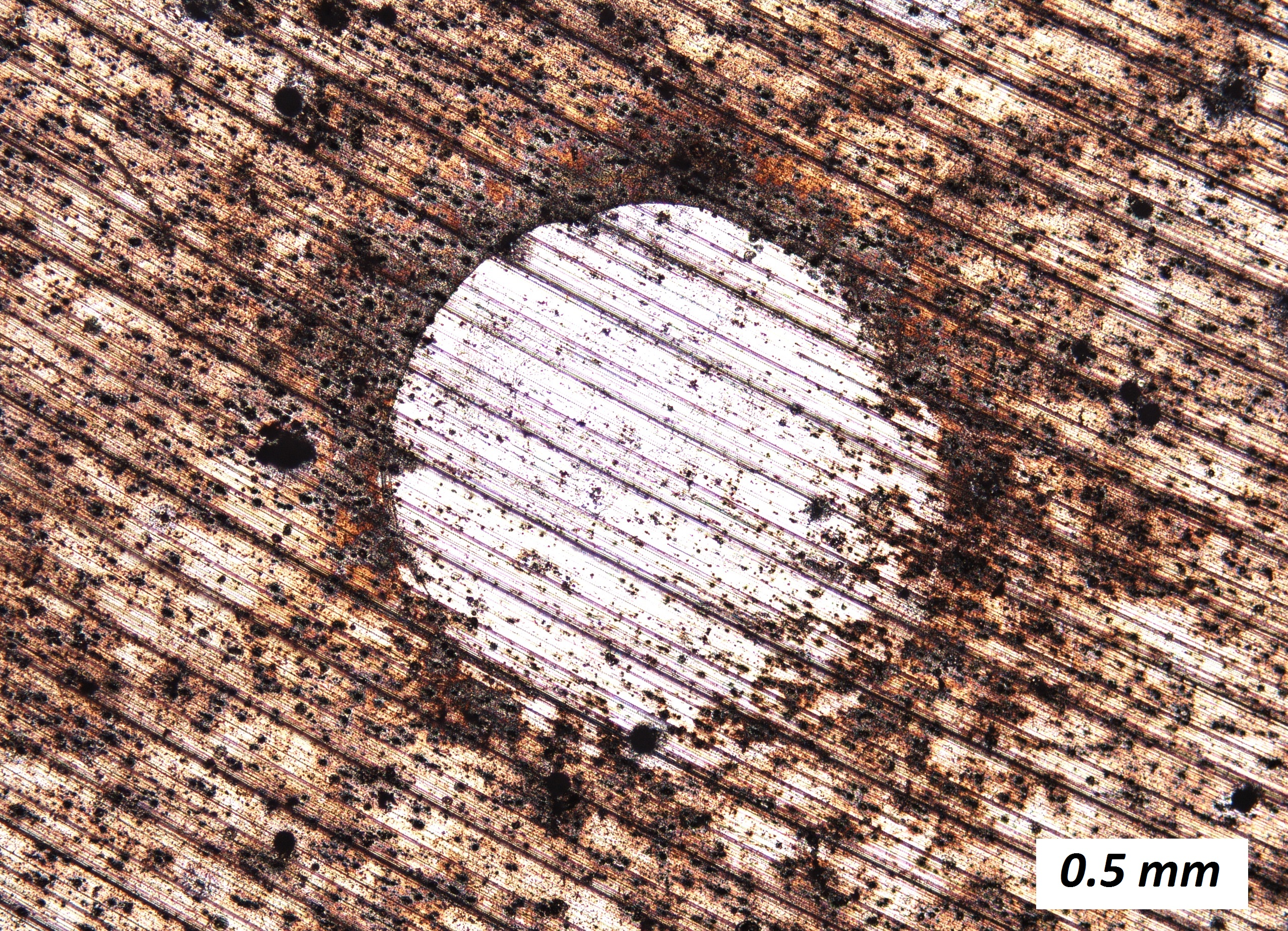
Corrosion of duralumin

Duralumin (also called duraluminum, duraluminium, duralum, dural(l)ium, or dural) is a trade name for one of the earliest types of age-hardenable aluminium–copper alloys. The term is a combination of Düren, dur (a German prefix meaning "hard"), and aluminium. Its use as a trade name is obsolete. Today the term mainly refers to aluminium-copper alloys, designated as the 2000 series by the international alloy designation system (IADS), as with 2014 and 2024 alloys used in airframe fabrication.

Duralumin was developed in 1909 in Germany. Duralumin is known for its strength and hardness, making it suitable for various applications, especially in the aviation and aerospace industry. However, it is susceptible to corrosion, which can be mitigated by using alclad-duralum materials.

== History ==
Duralumin was developed by the German metallurgist Alfred Wilm at private military-industrial laboratory Zentralstelle für wissenschaftlich-technische Untersuchungen (Center for Scientific-Technical Research) in Neubabelsberg. In 1903, Wilm discovered that after quenching, an aluminium alloy containing 4% copper would harden when left at room temperature for several days. Further improvements led to the introduction of duralumin in 1909. The name, originally a trade mark of Dürener Metallwerke AG which acquired Wilm's patents and commercialized the material, is mainly used in pop-science to describe all Al-Cu alloys system, or '2000' series, as designated through the international alloy designation system originally created in 1970 by the Aluminum Association.

== Composition ==
In addition to aluminium, the main materials in duralumin are copper, manganese and magnesium. For instance, Duraluminium 2024 consists of 91–95% aluminium, 3.8–4.9% copper, 1.2–1.8% magnesium, 0.3–0.9% manganese, <0.5% iron, <0.5% silicon, <0.25% zinc, <0.15% titanium, <0.10% chromium and no more than 0.15% of other elements combined. Although the addition of copper improves strength, it also makes these alloys susceptible to corrosion. Corrosion resistance can be greatly enhanced by bonding a high-purity aluminium surface layer, referred to as alclad-duralum. Alclad materials are commonly used in the aircraft industry as of 2003.

== Microstructure ==
Duralumin's strength and durability stem from its microstructure, which is significantly influenced by heat treatment processes.

=== Initial microstructure ===
Solid Solution: After initial solidification, duralumin exists as a single-phase solid solution, primarily composed of aluminium atoms with dispersed copper, magnesium, and other alloying elements. This initial state is relatively soft and ductile.

=== Heat treatment and microstructural changes ===
Solution annealing: Duralumin undergoes solution annealing, a high-temperature heat treatment process that dissolves the alloying elements into the aluminium matrix, creating a homogeneous solid solution.

Quenching: Rapid cooling (quenching) after solution annealing freezes the high-temperature solid solution, preventing the precipitation of strengthening phases.

Aging (precipitation hardening): During aging, the supersaturated solid solution becomes unstable. Fine precipitates, such as CuAl2 and Mg2Si, form within the aluminum matrix. These precipitates act as obstacles to dislocation movement, significantly increasing the alloy's strength and hardness.

=== Final microstructure ===
The final microstructure of duralumin consists of a predominantly aluminium matrix with dispersed fine precipitates (CuAl2, Mg2Si) grain boundaries. The size, distribution, and type of precipitates play a crucial role in determining the mechanical properties of duralumin. Optimal aging conditions lead to the formation of finely dispersed precipitates, resulting in peak strength and hardness.

== Applications ==
Aluminium alloyed with copper (AlCu alloys), which can be precipitation hardened, are designated by the International Alloy Designation System as the 2000 series. Typical uses for wrought AlCu alloys include:

- 2011: Wire, rod, and bar for screw machine products. Applications where good machinability and good strength are required
- 2014: Heavy-duty forgings, plate, and extrusions for aircraft fittings, wheels, and major structural components, space booster tankage and structure, truck frame and suspension components. Applications requiring high strength and hardness including service at elevated temperatures
- 2017 or Avional (France): Around 1% Si. Good machinability. Acceptable resistance to corrosion in air and mechanical properties. Also called AU4G in France. Used for aircraft applications between the wars in France and Italy Also saw some use in motor-racing applications from the 1960s, as it is a tolerant alloy that could be press-formed with relatively unsophisticated equipment.
- 2024: Aircraft structures, rivets, hardware, truck wheels, screw machine products, and other structural applications
- 2036: Sheet for auto body panels
- 2048: Sheet and plate in structural components for aerospace application and military equipment

=== Aviation ===
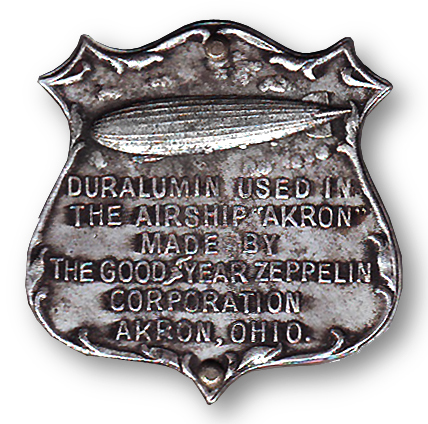
Duralumin sample from the 1931 airship USS Akron (ZRS-4)

German scientific literature openly published information about duralumin, its composition and heat treatment, before the outbreak of World War I in 1914. Despite this, use of the alloy outside Germany did not occur until after fighting ended in 1918. Reports of German use during World War I, even in technical journals such as Flight, could still mis-identify its key alloying component as magnesium rather than copper. Engineers in the UK showed little interest in duralumin for aircraft until after the war.

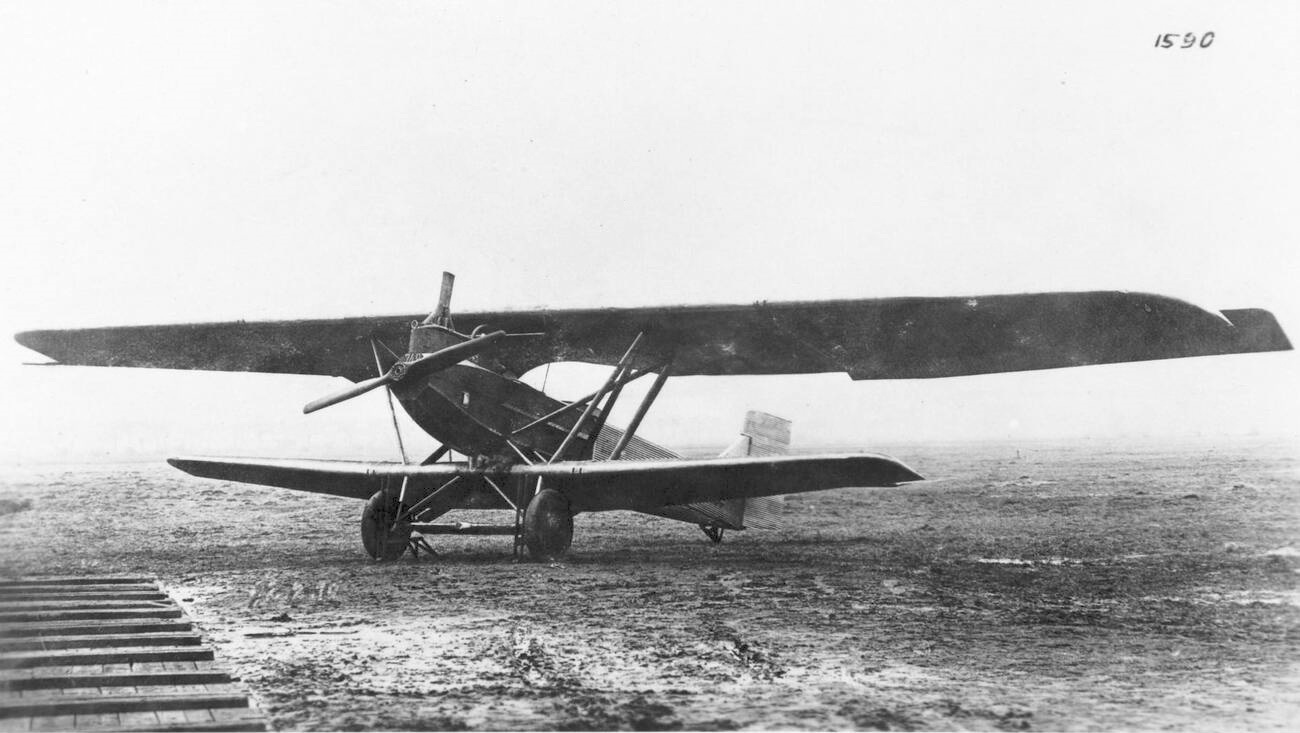
The first mass-production aircraft to make extensive use of duralumin, the armored Junkers J.I sesquiplane of World War I

The earliest known attempt to use duralumin for a heavier-than-air aircraft structure occurred in 1916, when Hugo Junkers first introduced its use in the airframe of the Junkers J 3, a single-engined monoplane "technology demonstrator" that marked the first use of the Junkers trademark duralumin corrugated skinning. The Junkers company completed only the covered wings and tubular fuselage framework of the J 3 before abandoning its development. The slightly later, solely IdFlieg-designated Junkers J.I armoured sesquiplane of 1917, known to the factory as the Junkers J 4, had its all-metal wings and horizontal stabilizer made in the same manner as the J 3's wings had been, like the experimental and airworthy all-duralumin Junkers J 7 single-seat fighter design, which led to the Junkers D.I low-wing monoplane fighter, introducing all-duralumin aircraft structural technology to German military aviation in 1918.

Its first use in aerostatic airframes came in rigid airship frames, eventually including all those of the "Great Airship" era of the 1920s and 1930s: the British-built R100, the German passenger Zeppelins LZ 127 Graf Zeppelin, LZ 129 Hindenburg, LZ 130 Graf Zeppelin II, and the U.S. Navy airships USS Los Angeles (ZR-3, ex-LZ 126), USS Akron (ZRS-4) and USS Macon (ZRS-5).

=== Bicycles ===
Duralumin was used to manufacture bicycle components and framesets from the 1930s to 1990s. Several companies in Saint-Étienne, France, stood out for their early, innovative adoption of duralumin: in 1932, Verot et Perrin developed the first light alloy crank arms; in 1934, Haubtmann released a complete crankset; from 1935 on, Duralumin freewheels, derailleurs, pedals, brakes and handlebars were manufactured by several companies.

Complete framesets followed quickly, including those manufactured by: Mercier (and Aviac and other licensees) with their popular Meca Dural family of models, the Pelissier brothers and their race-worthy La Perle models, and Nicolas Barra and his mid-twentieth century "Barralumin" creations. Other names that come up here also included: Pierre Caminade, with his beautiful Caminargent creations and their exotic octagonal tubing, and also Gnome et Rhône, with its deep heritage as an aircraft engine manufacturer that also diversified into motorcycles, velomotors and bicycles after World War Two.

Mitsubishi Heavy Industries, which was prohibited from producing aircraft during the American occupation of Japan, manufactured the "cross" bicycle out of surplus wartime duralumin in 1946. The "cross" was designed by Kiro Honjo, a former aircraft designer responsible for the Mitsubishi G4M.

Duralumin use in bicycle manufacturing faded in the 1970s and 1980s. Vitus nonetheless released the venerable "979" frameset in 1979, a "Duralinox" model that became an instant classic among cyclists. The Vitus 979 was the first production aluminium frameset whose thin-wall 5083/5086 tubing was slip-fit and then glued together using a dry heat-activated epoxy. The result was an extremely lightweight but very durable frameset. Production of the Vitus 979 continued until 1992.

=== Automotive ===
In 2011, BBS Automotive made the RI-D, the world's first production automobile wheel made of duralumin. The company has since made other wheels of duralumin also, such as the RZ-D.
