= Bushcaddy R-120 =

Canadian homebuilt light aircraft

R-120
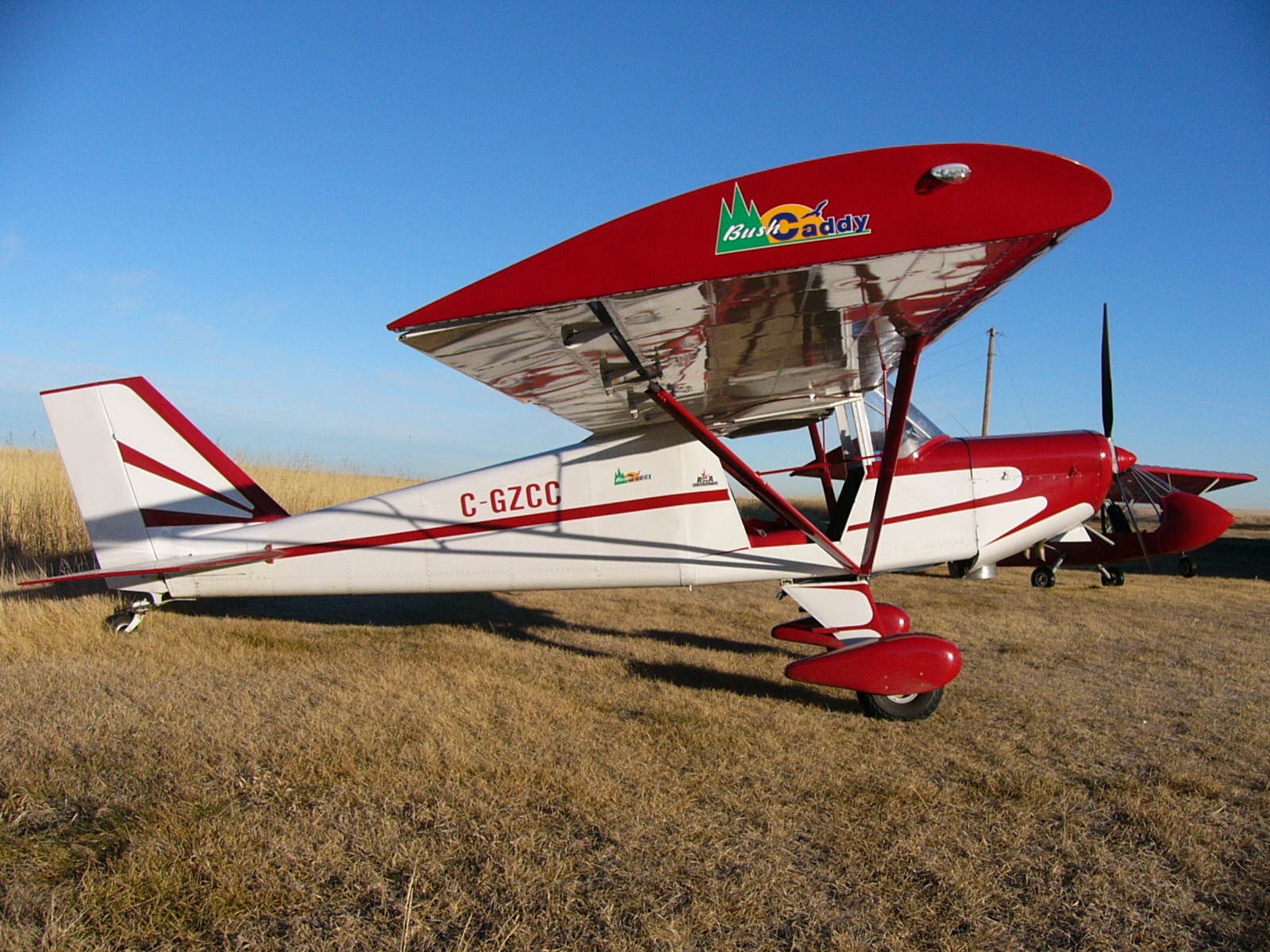
- CLASS R-120 BushCaddy

General information
- Type: Kit aircraft
- National origin: Canada
- Manufacturer: Canadian Light Aircraft Sales and Service; Bushcaddy
- Status: In production
- Number built: 43 (December 2011)

History
- Developed from: Bushcaddy R-80
- Variant: Bushcaddy L-160

The Bushcaddy R-120 is a Canadian kit aircraft produced by Canadian Light Aircraft Sales and Service (CLASS) of St. Lazare, Quebec and later Les Cedres, Quebec and now Bushcaddy of Lachute, Quebec and more recently Cornwall Regional Airport in Summerstown, Ontario.

The R-120 is a development of the Bushcaddy R-80 and is supplied as a kit for amateur construction.

== Design and development ==
The aircraft was designed to comply with the Canadian and United States amateur-built aircraft rules. It features a strut-braced high-wing, a two-seats-in-side-by-side configuration enclosed cockpit, fixed tricycle landing gear or conventional landing gear and a single engine in tractor configuration. The R-120 is structurally strengthened over the R-80 to allow a higher gross weight and accept larger engines.

The aircraft is made from 6061-T6 aluminum sheet over a cage of welded aluminum square 6061-T6 aluminum tube. The tail boom is conventional semi-monocoque construction. The non-tapered planform wings have 6061-T6 ribs and spars and employ a NACA 4413 (mod) airfoil. The airfoil modification removes the undercamber on the bottom of the wing, which makes construction easier, without giving up low speed performance. The aircraft's structure uses 2024-T3 aluminium for critical parts where extra strength is required, such as the spar, float and strut attachments as well as other critical components like the rudder horns. The R-120's structure is covered with 6061-T6 sheet of varying thicknesses. The wings are supported by conventional "V" struts. 6061-T6 is predominantly used for its lower cost and also its better corrosion resistance, since many R-120s are flown on floats. Its 32 ft (9.8 m) span wing has an area of 168 sq ft (15.6 m^{2}). Flaps are optional.

Standard engines used on the R-120 include the 80 hp (60 kW) Rotax 912UL, the 100 hp (75 kW) Rotax 912ULS, the turbocharged 115 hp (86 kW) Rotax 914, the 100 hp (75 kW) Continental O-200, the 108 hp (81 kW) Lycoming O-235, the 120 hp (89 kW) Jabiru 3300 and other four-stroke powerplants. The aircraft can also be mounted on floats and skis. Controls include a central "Y" control stick.

Construction time for the R-120 from the factory kit is 1,000 hours.

== Variants ==
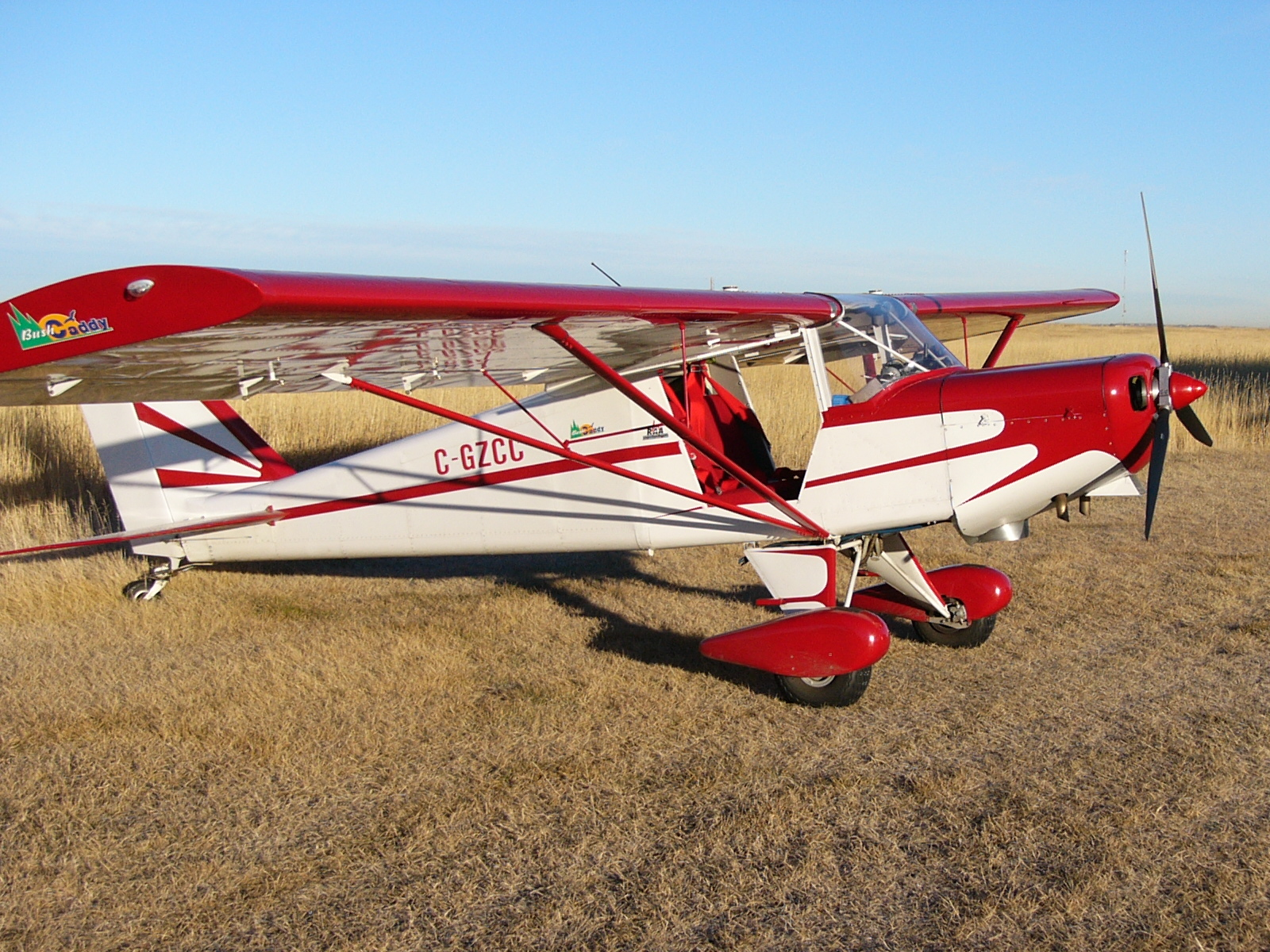
CLASS R-120 BushCaddy on wheels

CLASS R-120 BushCaddy
Version produced by CLASS of Saint-Lazare, Quebec. Production was later moved to Les Cedres, Quebec.
Bushcaddy R-120
Current production version produced by Bushcaddy of Lachute, Quebec after buying the rights from CLASS in 2011.

== Specifications (R-120) ==
Data from KitPlanes and Bushcaddy

General characteristics

- Crew: one
- Capacity: one passenger
- Length: 22 ft 1 in (6.73 m)
- Wingspan: 32 ft (9.8 m)
- Wing area: 168 sq ft (15.6 m^{2})
- Airfoil: NACA 4413 (mod)
- Empty weight: 832 lb (377 kg)
- Gross weight: 1,500 lb (680 kg) (1700 lbs (771kg) with factory approval)
- Fuel capacity: 155 litres (34 imp gal; 41 US gal)
- Powerplant: 1 × Rotax 912ULS four cylinder, liquid and air-cooled, four stroke aircraft engine, 100 hp (75 kW)

Performance

- Cruise speed: 110 mph (180 km/h, 96 kn) at 75% power
- Stall speed: 34 mph (55 km/h, 30 kn)
- Never exceed speed: 130 mph (210 km/h, 110 kn)
- Service ceiling: 16,000 ft (4,900 m)
- g limits: +5.7/-3.8
- Rate of climb: 800 ft/min (4.1 m/s)
- Wing loading: 8.9 lb/sq ft (43 kg/m^{2})
