= Bushcaddy L-162 Max =

Canadian homebuilt light aircraft

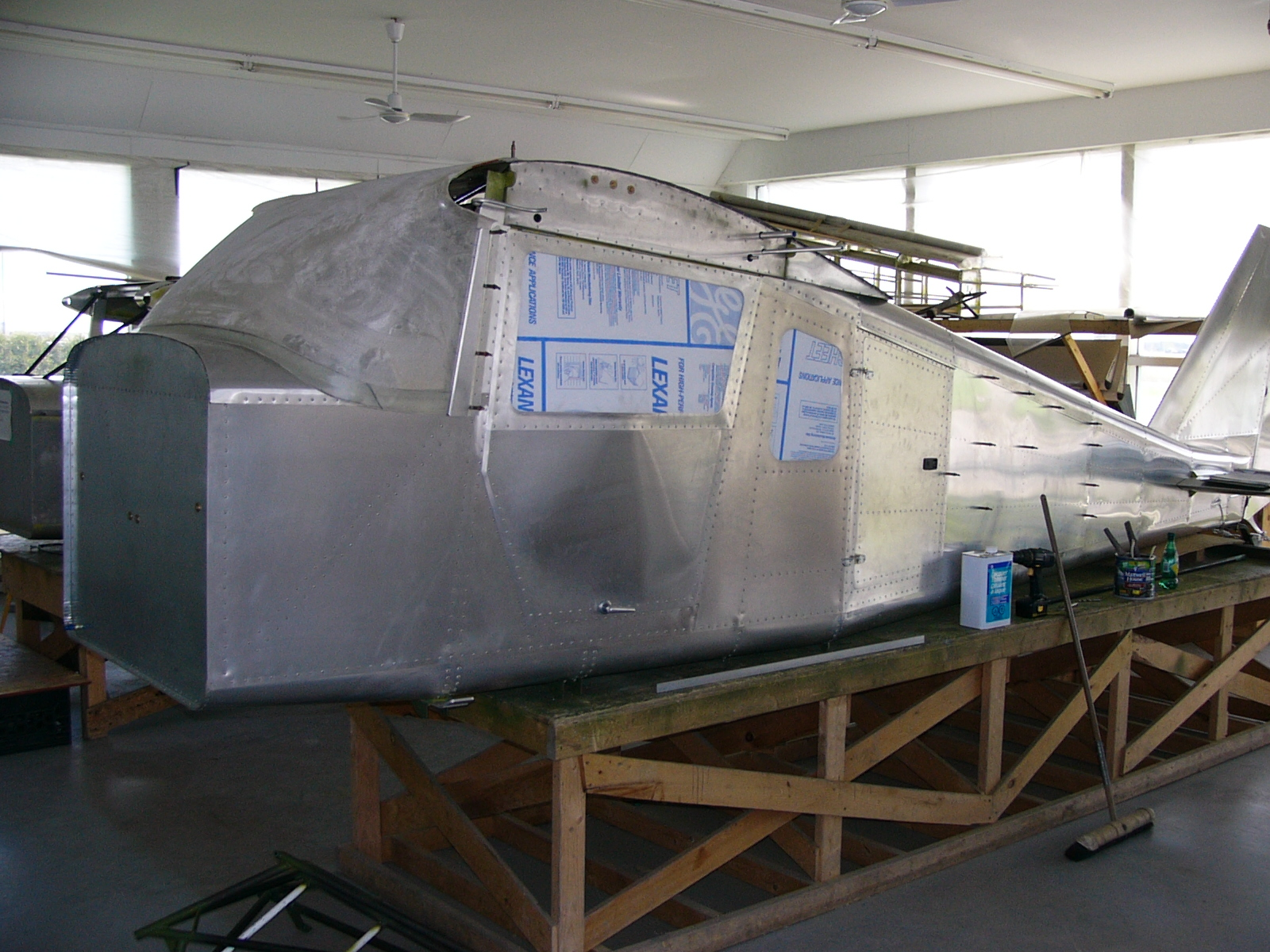
- L-162 Max prototype under construction at CLASS in May 2005

General information
- Type: Kit aircraft
- National origin: Canada
- Manufacturer: Canadian Light Aircraft Sales and Service (2005-2011); Bushcaddy (2011-present)
- Designer: Sean Gilmore
- Status: In production
- Number built: 12 (December 2011)

History
- Introduction date: 2005
- Developed from: Bushcaddy L-160
- Variant: Bushcaddy L-164

The Bushcaddy L-162 Max is a Canadian kit aircraft that was designed by Sean Gilmore and produced by Canadian Light Aircraft Sales and Service and most recently by Bushcaddy. The aircraft is supplied as a kit for amateur construction.

== Design and development ==
The L-162 was developed from the Bushcaddy L-160 as a result of customer demand for a freight aircraft that could also provide room for a second row of seats behind the pilot and passenger seats. Unlike the L-160's designation, which indicates that the design engine for that model was originally a Lycoming O-320 of 160 hp (119 kW), the L-162 designation is just a numerical sequence and does not indicate horsepower.

The L-162 features a strut-braced high-wing, a two-seats-in-side-by-side configuration enclosed cockpit, fixed conventional landing gear, or optionally tricycle landing gear, and a single engine in tractor configuration. Floats and skis can also be fitted.

The aircraft fuselage is made with a frame of welded 6061-T6 aluminum square tubing, covered in 6061-T6 sheet. Its 36 ft (11.0 m) span wing employs V-struts with jury struts. The wing has an area of 189 sq ft (17.6 m^{2}) and flaps. It can accept four-stroke powerplants from 160 to 250 hp (119 to 186 kW), with the Lycoming O-360 of 180 hp (134 kW) commonly used. Cabin access is via two fold-up doors.

Construction time for the factory kit is estimated at 1200 hours. Twelve examples had been completed and flown by December 2011.

== Specifications (L-162 Max) ==
Data from Kitplanes and Bushcaddy

General characteristics

- Crew: one
- Capacity: three passengers
- Length: 24 ft 4 in (7.42 m)
- Wingspan: 36 ft 0 in (10.97 m)
- Wing area: 189 sq ft (17.6 m^{2})
- Airfoil: NACA 4413 (mod)
- Empty weight: 1,250 lb (567 kg)
- Gross weight: 2,650 lb (1,202 kg)
- Fuel capacity: 48 U.S. gallons (180 L; 40 imp gal)
- Powerplant: 1 × Lycoming O-320 four cylinder, air-cooled, four stroke aircraft engine, 160 hp (120 kW)

Performance

- Maximum speed: 140 mph (230 km/h, 120 kn)
- Cruise speed: 128 mph (206 km/h, 111 kn) at 75% power
- Stall speed: 37 mph (60 km/h, 32 kn) flaps down
- Range: 720 mi (1,160 km, 630 nmi)
- Service ceiling: 13,000 ft (4,000 m)
- g limits: +5.3/-3.2
- Rate of climb: 850 ft/min (4.3 m/s)
- Wing loading: 14.02 lb/sq ft (68.5 kg/m^{2})
