= R80 =

R80 or R-80 may refer to:

== Aircraft ==
- R80 (airship), a British rigid airship
- Bushcaddy R-80, a Canadian ultralight and light-sport aircraft
- Fisher R-80 Tiger Moth, a Canadian kit biplane
- RAI R-80, an Indonesian regional turboprop airliner
- Romano R.80, a French aerobatic biplane

== Other uses ==
- R80 (South Africa), a road
- Colt R80, a machine gun
- Proteinuria
- R80 series of preferred numbers
- Toyota Noah (R80), a minivan
- R80, a Ferris wheel designed by Ronald Bussink
