= Bushcaddy L-164 =

Canadian homebuilt light aircraft

General information
- Type: Kit aircraft
- National origin: Canada
- Manufacturer: Canadian Light Aircraft Sales and Service (circa 2007-2011); Bushcaddy (2011-present)
- Designer: Sean Gilmore
- Status: In production
- Number built: 4 (December 2011)

History
- Introduction date: Circa 2007
- Developed from: Bushcaddy L-162 Max

The Bushcaddy L-164 is a Canadian kit aircraft that was designed by Sean Gilmore and produced by Canadian Light Aircraft Sales and Service and most recently by Bushcaddy. The aircraft is supplied as a kit for amateur construction.

== Design and development ==
The L-164 was developed from the Bushcaddy L-162 as a true four-seat aircraft. Unlike the L-160's designation, which indicates that the design engine for that model was originally a Lycoming O-320 of 160 hp (119 kW), the L-164 designation is just a numerical sequence and does not indicate horsepower.

The L-164 features a strut-braced high-wing, a four-seat enclosed cockpit, fixed conventional landing gear, or optionally tricycle landing gear, and a single engine in tractor configuration. Floats and skis can also be fitted.

The aircraft fuselage is made with a frame of welded 6061-T6 aluminum square tubing, covered in 6061-T6 sheet. Its 36 ft (11.0 m) span wing employs V-struts with jury struts. The wing has an area of 189 sq ft (17.6 m^{2}) and flaps. It can accept four-stroke powerplants from 180 to 250 hp (134 to 186 kW), with the Lycoming O-360 of 180 hp (134 kW) and a Franklin Engine Company powerplant of 220 hp (164 kW) commonly used. Cabin access is via two fold-up doors.

Construction time for the factory kit is estimated at 1200 hours or 300 hours from the quick-build kit. Four examples had been completed and flown by December 2011.

== Variants ==
L-164 B
Passenger model.
L-164 C
All cargo model.

== Specifications (L-164) ==
Data from Kitplanes and Bushcaddy

General characteristics

- Crew: one
- Capacity: three passengers
- Length: 25 ft 6 in (7.77 m)
- Wingspan: 36 ft 0 in (10.97 m)
- Wing area: 189 sq ft (17.6 m^{2})
- Airfoil: NACA 4413 (mod)
- Empty weight: 1,350 lb (612 kg)
- Gross weight: 2,500 lb (1,134 kg)
- Fuel capacity: 60 U.S. gallons (230 L; 50 imp gal)
- Powerplant: 1 × Lycoming I0-360-L2A four cylinder, fuel-injected, air-cooled, four stroke aircraft engine, 160 hp (120 kW)
- Propellers: 2-bladed Sensenich 76EM8, 6 ft 4 in (1.93 m) diameter

Performance

- Maximum speed: 129 mph (208 km/h, 112 kn)
- Cruise speed: 115 mph (185 km/h, 100 kn) at 75% power
- Stall speed: 38 mph (61 km/h, 33 kn) flaps down
- Range: 750 mi (1,210 km, 650 nmi)
- g limits: +5.3/-3.2 (+3.8/-1.9 normal category)
- Rate of climb: 1,200 ft/min (6.1 m/s)
- Wing loading: 13.22 lb/sq ft (64.5 kg/m^{2})
