= L-160 =

L-160 can refer to:

- Aero L-160 Brigadyr, a Czech utility aircraft
- Bushcaddy L-160, a Canadian kit aircraft
