= Kynal =

Brand name for aluminum alloys developed and produced by Imperial Chemical Industries

Kynal was a brand name for a series of aluminium alloys developed and originally produced by the British chemical manufacturer Imperial Chemical Industries (ICI). The name was derived from Kynoch, an existing ICI trademark for ammunition, and aluminium. It was largely used as substitute for Alclad, a popular corrosion-resistant aluminium alloy.

ICI produced Kynal in quantity at a facility in Waunarlwydd, outside Swansea. The material was extensively used by the British aviation industry during the Second World War, being recognised as a strategic resource. Numerous variations upon the material were devised by ICI around this time. During the 1950s, British Railways became a key consumer of Kynal, using the material on numerous members of its new fleet of diesel traction, including the first generation diesel multiple units (DMUs). By the twenty-first century, the material was largely considered to be obsolete, while the Waunarlwydd chemical works was permanently closed during the 2000s.

== History ==
A key facility involved in the production of Kynal was the Ministry of Aircraft Production's factory at Waunarlwydd, near Swansea. ICI built and operated the plant on the government's behalf. Functionally, Kynal was similar to, and could be a substitute for, Alclad. Applications included various forged items, including pipework, vessels, and heat exchangers, as well as fuselage elements of aircraft. By 1938, the material was being producing at a very high volume as a consequence of the European powers having entered a period of rearmament around the time of Munich crisis, which led into the Second World War.

During the postwar era, Kynal continued to hold its strategic importance. The material proliferated throughout British engineering throughout the 1950s and 1960s; it began to be used in the frames of road vehicles during the mid 1950s. Kynal was used extensively for British Railways' modernisation of the 1950s, specifically in the construction of the publicly-owned organisation's new diesel fleet. The majority of the 'lightweight' diesel multiple units (DMUs) featured the material. Around the same era, the company was also involved in studies into the use of Kynal as a roofing material.

By the twenty-first century, Kynal was largely considered to be obsolete as a material. During the 2000s, the original Waunarlwydd plant, which was by then owned by Alcoa, was closed down. Despite this, research efforts into fields such as battery technology have involved the use of Kynal.

== Table ==
	Al	Cu	Mg	Si	Mn	Ni	Zn	Others	
	%								
Kynal P5	≥99.5								Pure aluminium
Kynal P10	≥99								Pure aluminium
	Aluminium–silicon alloys								
Kynal PA15				12					Brazing wire
Kynal PA16				5					Brazing wire
Kynal PA17				5					Brazing wire
	Aluminium–manganese alloys								
Kynal PA19					1.25				
	Aluminium–magnesium alloys								
Kynal M35/1			2						
Kynal M35/2			3						
Kynal M36			5						
Kynal M37			7						
	Aluminium–magnesium–silicon alloys								
Kynal M39/1			0.7	0.5					
Kynal M39/2			0.7	1					
	Aluminium–copper alloys								
Kynal 90		2.2	0.3						
Kynal C65		4	0.6		0.5				
Kynal C66		4.4	0.6	0.7	0.6				
Kynal C67		4.4	0.6	0.7	0.6				
Kynal C69		1	1						
	Nickel–aluminium alloys								
Kynal Y88		2.6	1	1		1		0.1% Ti	
Kynal Y92		4	1.5			2			
	Aluminium–zinc alloys								
Kynal Z93		0.4	2.7				5.3		
Kynal-Core C65A									Pure aluminium-clad forms of the corresponding alloys
Kynal-Core C66A									Pure aluminium-clad forms of the corresponding alloys
Kynal-Core C67A									Pure aluminium-clad forms of the corresponding alloys
Kynal-Core C68A									Pure aluminium-clad forms of the corresponding alloys
Kynal-Core Z93A									Pure aluminium-clad forms of the corresponding alloys

== See also ==
- Kycube, a similarly named series of copper beryllium alloys produced by IMI.
