= The Recycling Partnership =

U.S. nonprofit organization

- Formation: July 1, 2014; 11 years ago
- Founders: The Aluminum Association and other material industries
- Type: Nonprofit
- Legal status: 501(c)(3) organization
- Purpose: Promote and encourage curbside recycling schemes
- Location: Washington, DC, United States
- Region served: United States
- Fields: Recycling
- Chief Executive Officer: Keefe Harrison
- Website: recyclingpartnership.org
- Formerly called: Curbside Value Partnership

The Recycling Partnership, formerly Curbside Value Partnership, is an American nonprofit organization established by The Aluminum Association as a partnership with other material industries to prompt curbside recycling.

== History ==
Curbside Value Partnership's success varies per community but on average, the interaction observers a 23% increase in recycling volume and an 18% increase in participation.

Curbside Value Partnership was selected to manage The Recycling Partnership. On July 1, 2014, The Recycling Partnership officially launched and selected three cities to seeds grant dollars in order to unlock public investment and dramatically increase recycling rates. The Recycling Partnership focuses on four key areas: growing collection capacity by supporting the switch to carts, supporting high quality education and outreach, providing technical assistance to ensure strategy across the material recovery supply chain, and champion building with local and state elected officials.

The inaugural group of funding partners include Alcoa, Amcor, American Chemistry Council, American Forest & Paper Association, Association of Postconsumer Plastic Recyclers, Ball, Carton Council of North America, Coca-Cola, SPI: The Plastics Industry Trade Association, and Sonoco.

Curbside Value Partnership became independent of The Aluminum Association in January 2011, when it was incorporated in Arlington, Virginia, as a 501(c)(3) with an independent Board of Directors. Keefe Harrison is the Chief Executive Officer.

Curbside Value Partnership is funded by members of The Aluminum Association and Can Manufacturers Institute including Alcoa, ARCO Aluminum, Anheuser-Busch Metal Containers, Ball Corporation, Novelis, and REXAM.
