= Bushcaddy R-80 =

Canadian homebuilt light aircraft

R-80
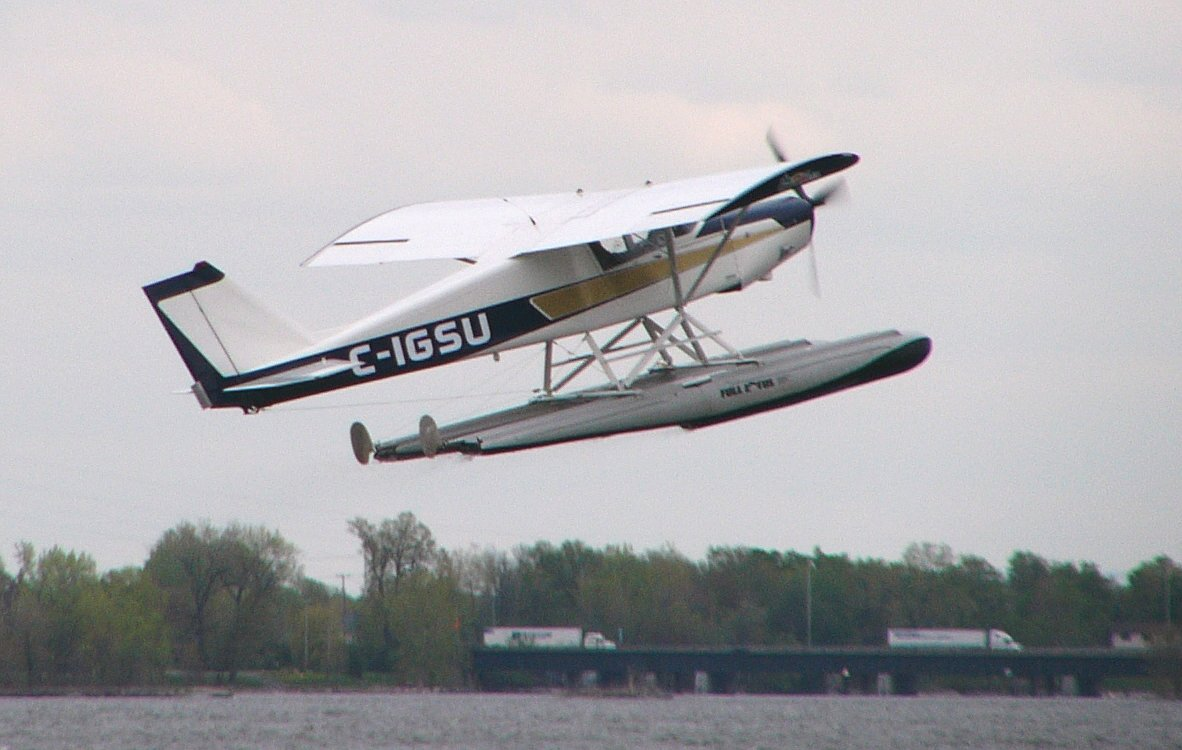
- CLASS R-80 BushCaddy

General information
- Type: Ultralight aircraft and Light-sport aircraft
- National origin: Canada
- Manufacturer: Club Aeronautique Delisle Incorporated (1994-98); Canadian Light Aircraft Sales and Service (1998-2011); Bushcaddy (2011-present)
- Designer: Jean Eudes Potvin
- Status: In production
- Number built: 80 (December 2011)

History
- Manufactured: 1994-present
- Introduction date: 1994

The Bushcaddy R-80 is a Canadian ultralight and light-sport aircraft that was designed by Jean Eudes Potvin of Lac Saint-Jean, Quebec in 1994 and produced by his company Club Aeronautique Delisle Incorporated (CADI). It was later built by Canadian Light Aircraft Sales and Service (CLASS) of St. Lazare, Quebec and later Les Cedres, Quebec and now Bushcaddy of Lachute, Quebec.

The R-80 designation indicates that the aircraft was originally designed for a Rotax engine of 80 hp (60 kW).

The aircraft is supplied as a kit for amateur construction or as a complete ready-to-fly-aircraft.

== Design and development ==
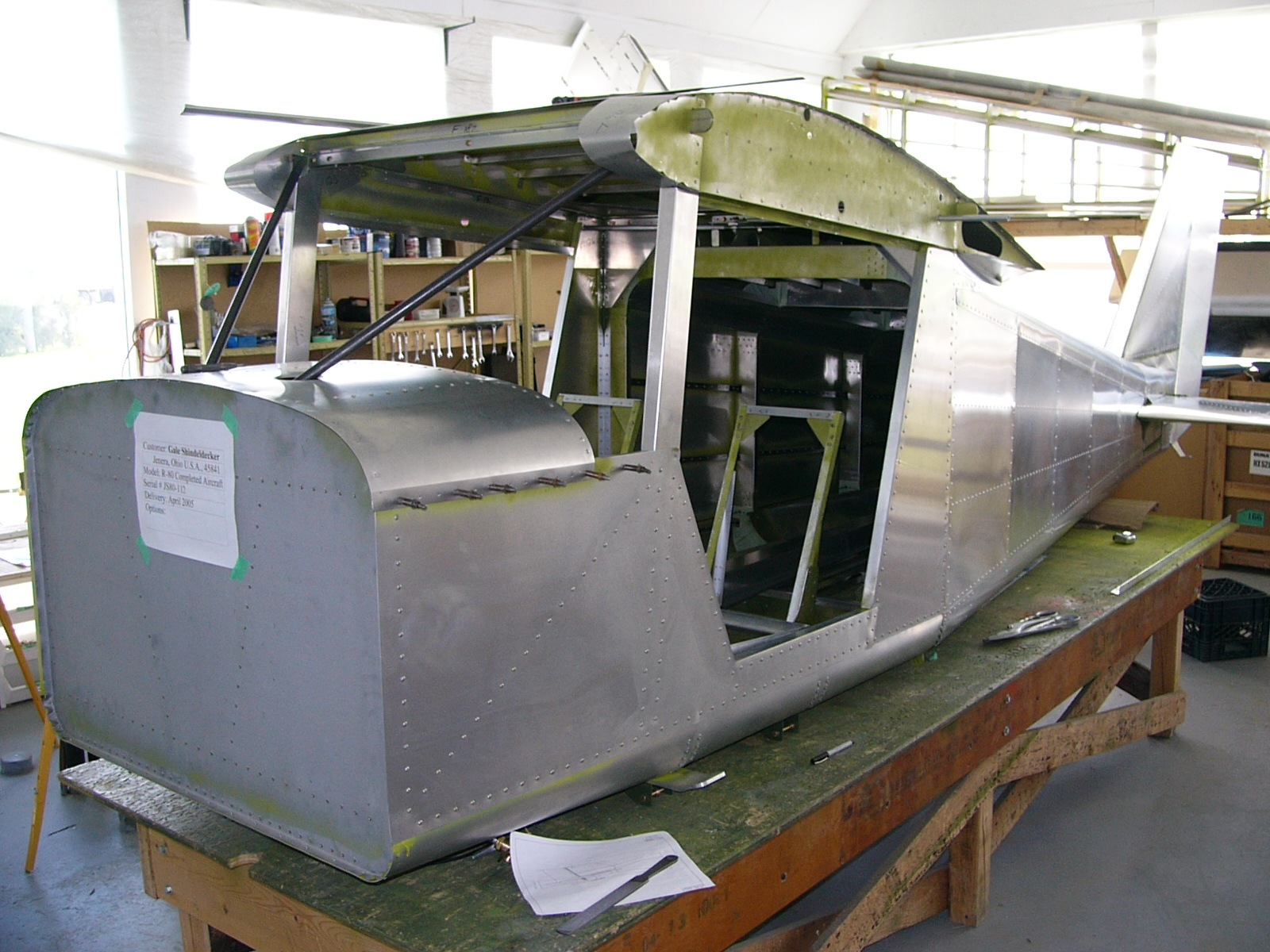
A CLASS R-80 Bush Caddy under construction at the CLASS factory in Les Cedres, Quebec, Canada.

The aircraft was designed to comply with the Canadian advanced ultralight rules and is also an approved US light-sport aircraft. It features a strut-braced high-wing, a two-seats-in-side-by-side configuration enclosed cockpit, fixed tricycle landing gear or conventional landing gear and a single engine in tractor configuration.

The aircraft is made from 6061-T6 aluminum sheet over a cage of welded aluminum square 6061-T6 aluminum tube. The tail boom is conventional semi-monocoque construction. The non-tapered planform wings have 6061-T6 ribs and spars and employ a NACA 4413 (mod) airfoil. The airfoil modification removes the undercamber on the bottom of the wing, which makes construction easier, without giving up low speed performance. The aircraft's structure uses 2024-T3 aluminium for critical parts where extra strength is required, such as the spar, float and strut attachments as well as other critical components like the rudder horns. The R-80's structure is covered with 6061-T6 sheet of varying thicknesses; wing bottom skins are 0.016 in (0.41 mm) inches thick while the top is 0.020 in (0.51 mm) inches. The wings are supported by conventional "V" struts. 6061-T6 is predominantly used for its lower cost and also its better corrosion resistance, since many R-80s are flown on floats. Its 32 ft (9.8 m) span wing has an area of 168 sq ft (15.6 m^{2}) and does not fit flaps.

Standard engines used on the R-80 include the 80 hp (60 kW) Rotax 912UL and the 100 hp (75 kW) Rotax 912ULS four-stroke powerplants. The 115 hp (86 kW) turbocharged Rotax 914 has also been fitted. The aircraft can also be mounted on floats and skis. Controls include a central "Y" control stick.

Construction time for the R-80 from the factory kit is 1,200 hours.

== Variants ==
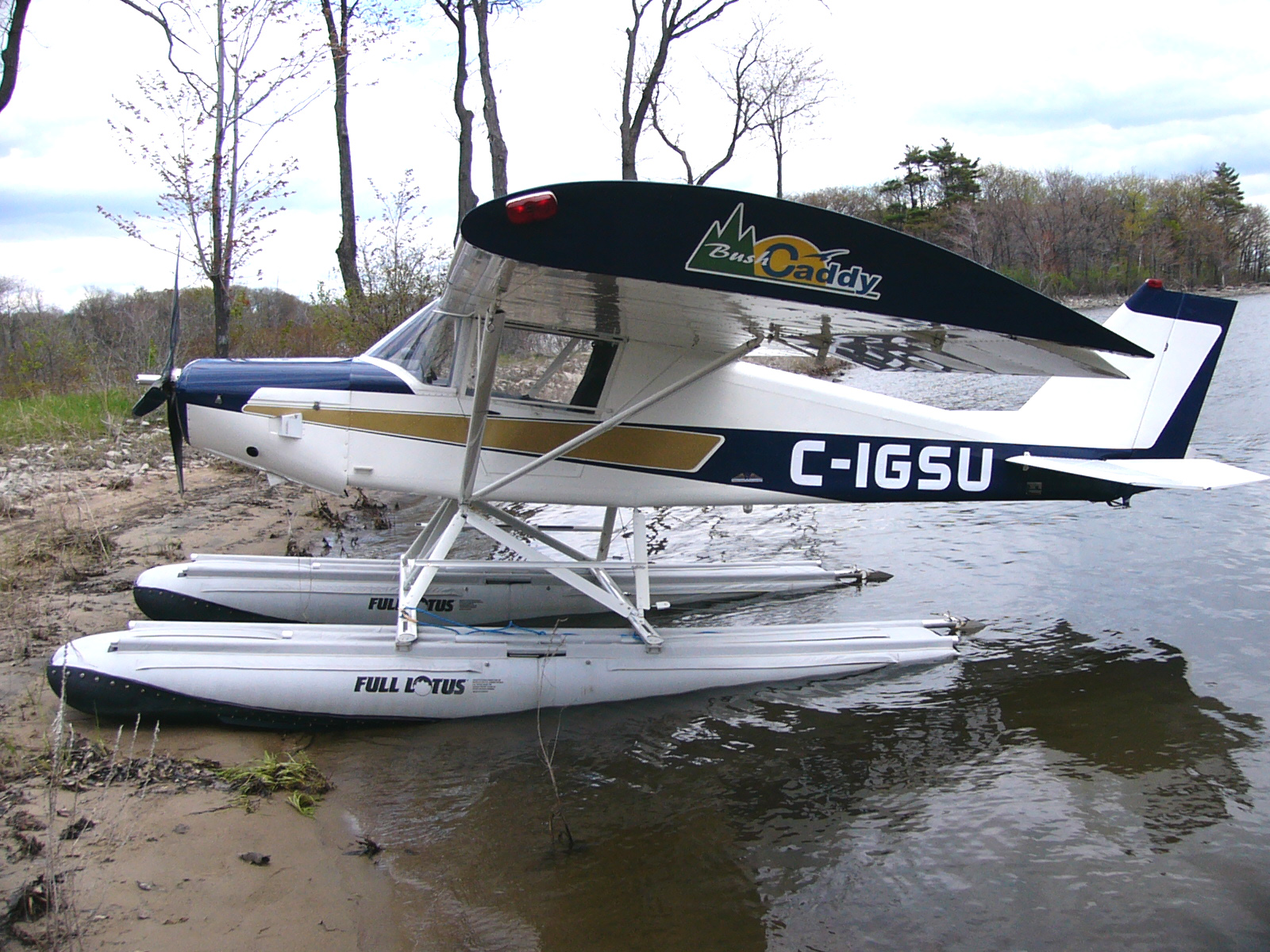
CLASS R-80 BushCaddy on floats

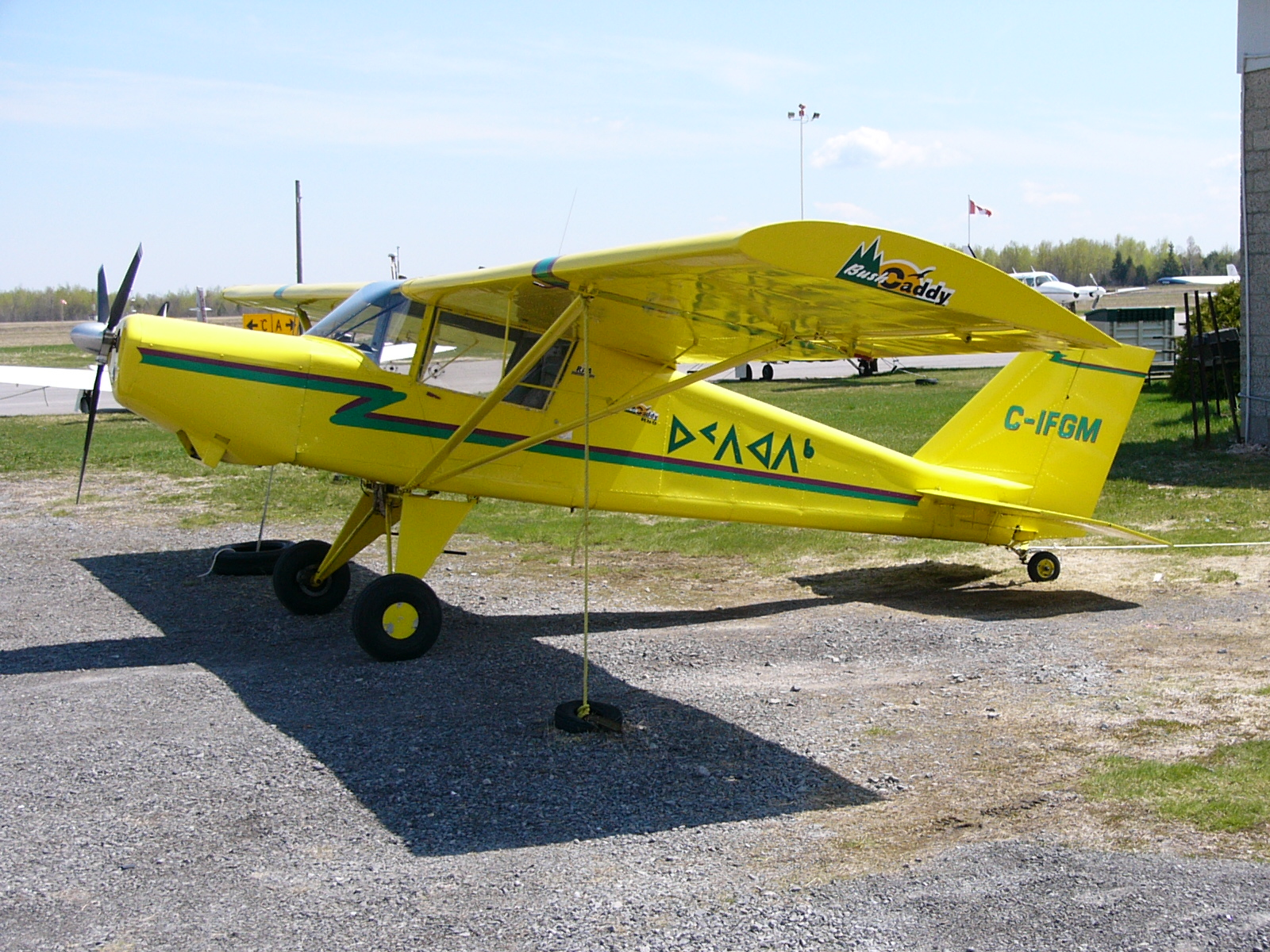
CLASS R-80 BushCaddy on wheels

CADI R-80
Original production version built by CADI, about 60 produced.
CLASS R-80 BushCaddy
Version produced by CLASS of Saint-Lazare, Quebec, after buying the rights from Potvin in 1998. Production was later moved to Les Cedres, Quebec. To acknowledge the CADI name the aircraft was named the Bushcaddy as it is capable of carrying "a load of people and freight into the Canadian bush".
Bushcaddy R-80
Current production version produced by Bushcaddy of Lachute, Quebec and later of Cornwall Regional Airport in Summerstown, Ontario, after buying the rights from CLASS in 2011.

== Specifications (R-80) ==
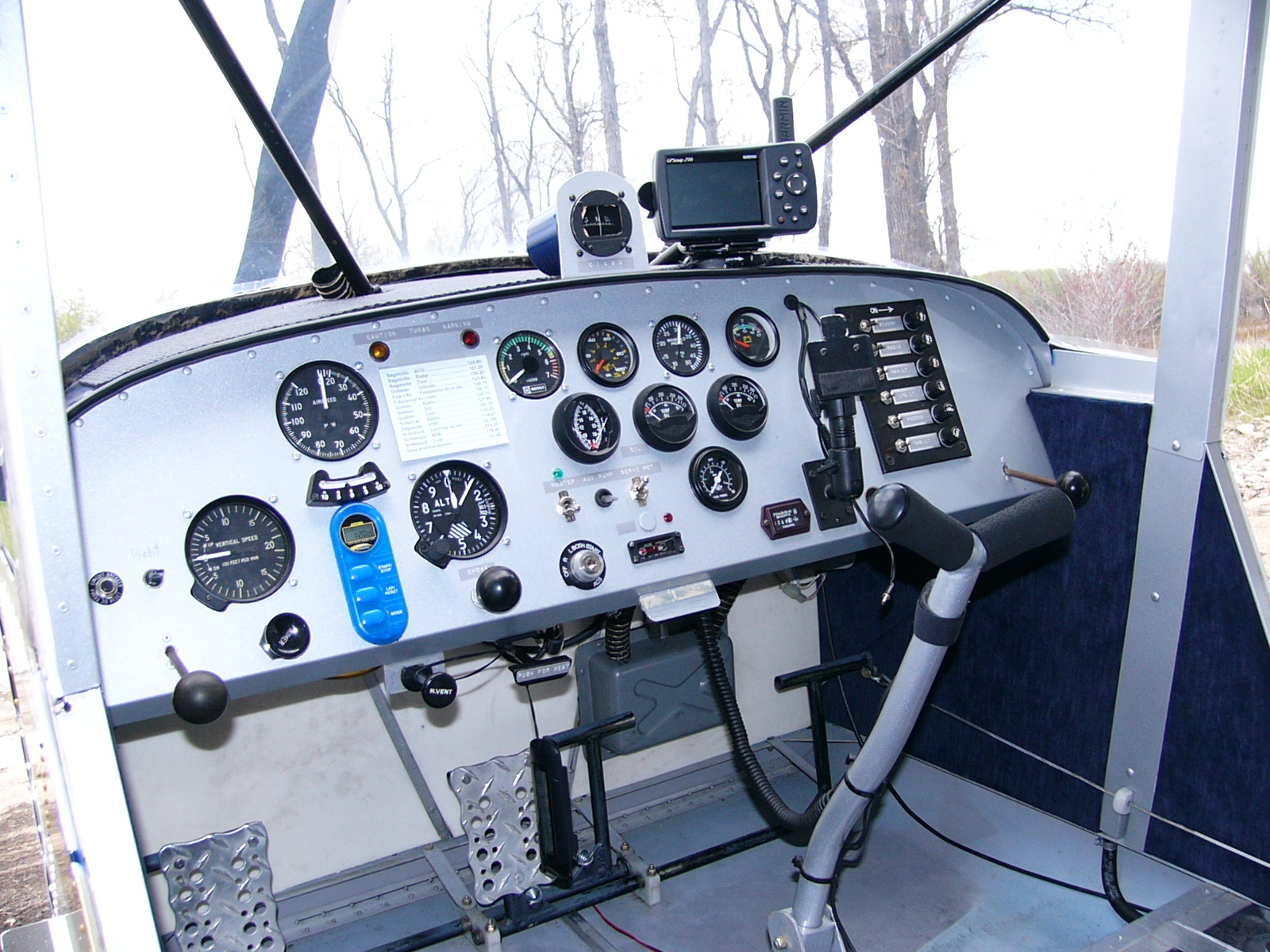
CLASS R-80 BushCaddy instrument panel

Data from Bayerl and Bushcaddy

General characteristics

- Crew: one
- Capacity: one passenger
- Length: 22 ft 1 in (6.73 m)
- Wingspan: 32 ft (9.8 m)
- Wing area: 168 sq ft (15.6 m^{2})
- Airfoil: NACA 4413 (mod)
- Empty weight: 710 lb (322 kg)
- Gross weight: 1,320 lb (599 kg) (1500 lbs with factory approval)
- Fuel capacity: 90 litres (20 imp gal; 24 US gal)
- Powerplant: 1 × Rotax 912ULS four cylinder, liquid and air-cooled, four stroke aircraft engine, 100 hp (75 kW)

Performance

- Cruise speed: 105 mph (169 km/h, 91 kn) at 75% power
- Stall speed: 34 mph (55 km/h, 30 kn)
- Never exceed speed: 120 mph (190 km/h, 100 kn)
- Service ceiling: 16,000 ft (4,900 m)
- g limits: +5.7/-3.8
- Rate of climb: 800 ft/min (4.1 m/s)
- Wing loading: 8.9 lb/sq ft (43 kg/m^{2})
