= Waunarlwydd =

- Location within Swansea
- Community: Waunarlwydd
- Principal area: Swansea
- Country: Wales
- Sovereign state: United Kingdom
- Post town: SWANSEA
- Postcode district: SA5
- Dialling code: 01792
- Police: South Wales
- Fire: Mid and West Wales
- Ambulance: Welsh
- UK Parliament: Gŵyr Abertawe
- Senedd Cymru – Welsh Parliament: Gŵyr Abertawe
- List of places UK Wales Swansea 51.6401°N 4.0205°W Map of the community

Waunarlwydd (Welsh for 'the lord's meadow'; arlwydd is a local variant of arglwydd) is a village and community in Swansea, Wales, within the newly formed Waunarlwydd ward in 2021. Waunarlwydd became a community in 2022.

== Transport ==
Buses are provided by First Cymru: these are the 15 or 16 Swansea - Waunarlwydd and Swansea - Gorseinon.

The main road in and out of the village is the B4295. The nearest motorway junction is 47 Swansea West (Penllergaer) on the M4.

The original main road from Swansea was Waunarlwydd Road, which starts from Cockett Road (A4216) at the Cockett Inn pub and runs to the meeting point of Cwmbach Road and Swansea Road at the old Lamb & Flag pub.

Although the West Wales Line runs through the village, there is no actual railway station: the nearest is Gowerton.

== Economy ==
Waunarlwydd was the home of an aluminium rolling operation owned by US company Alcoa. Alcoa announced in November 2006 that it would close the plant by the end of March 2007, with the loss of 298 jobs. Decommissioning works are now taking place, while a small workforce is still employed in homogenisation, where heat treatment takes place for the Kitts Green plant.

TIMET, the world's largest supplier of titanium metals, is now the major employer in the village, with the mill one of four European locations.

== Schools ==
There are two primary schools in the village: one is English language medium known as Waunarlwydd Primary School, this is located on Brithwen Road and replaced the original Swansea Road school. The other, Ysgol Gynradd Gymraeg Y Login Fach, is a Welsh language school located on Roseland Road.

After primary school children go on to either Ysgol Gyfun Gŵyr or Gowerton Comprehensive School.

== Religion ==
The Anglican church in the village is St Barnabas on Victoria Road. The church was built in 1888 for £1,200 in an Early English style and enlarged in 1903.

There are now only 2 chapels, Seion (Zion) (Welsh Baptist - Bedyddwyr) and Sardis (Welsh Congregational, built in 1860 to seat 500) are both on Swansea Road. Bethany (English Baptist, built in 1875 to seat 250) on Bryn Road was closed and the land has been sold.

== Sport ==
- Rugby: Waunarlwydd RFC currently play in WRU League 1 West Central and have 2 pitches
- Football: Waunarlwydd Galaxy has senior and junior teams competing in the Macron West Wales Premier League in the Welsh football league system and have 2 pitches
- Cricket: Waunarlwydd Cricket Club competed in Division 7 of the South Wales Cricket Association but the team folded in 2026.
- Darts: There are teams at the Farmers Arms and Masons Arms, there is also a woman's dart team that play in the Masons Arms.
- Pool: the village plays host to a largely successful pool team

== History ==
On 3 August 1940, the Luftwaffe dropped incendiary bombs on Waunarlwydd; there were no casualties.

== See also ==
- Kynal, brand name for the range of aluminium alloys produced by ICI at Waunarlwydd.
