= Bushcaddy =

Canadian homebuilt light aircraft manufacturer

Bushcaddy International Inc
- Company type: Private company
- Industry: Aerospace
- Founded: 1994
- Defunct: 2020
- Fate: Out of business
- Headquarters: Summerstown, Ontario, Canada
- Key people: CEO: Tony Watkin
- Products: Kit aircraft
- Services: Aircraft manufacturing, maintenance, repairs
- Number of employees: 5 (2005)
- Website: bushcaddy.com

Bushcaddy Aircraft Canada, usually just called Bushcaddy or BushCaddy, was a Canadian aircraft manufacturer based at the Cornwall Regional Airport in Summerstown, Ontario. The company specialized in the design and manufacture of kit aircraft.

By August 2020 the company website had been blanked and it is likely that the company is no longer in business.

== History ==
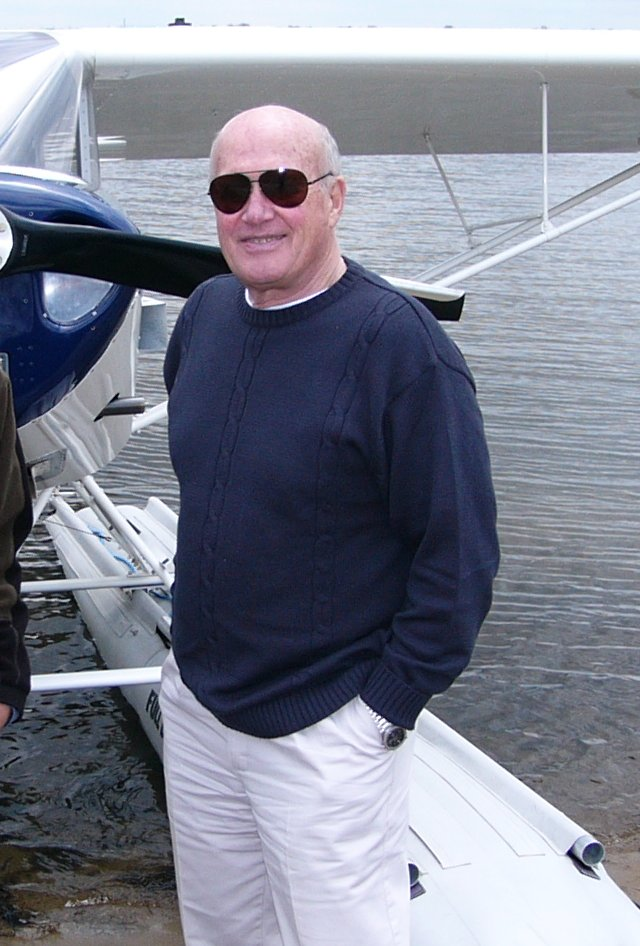
Sean Gilmore, designer of the Bushcaddy L-162 Max and L-164.

The company started as a flight training operation called Club Aeronautique Delisle Incorporated (CADI), based in Lac Saint-Jean, Quebec. It was founded by Jean Eude Potvin who designed the CADI R-80 and put it into production as a kit aircraft in 1994. He went on to design and build the R-120 and L-160.

Sean Gilmore and Marlene Gill started a flight training venture at Montréal/Saint-Lazare Aerodrome, operating a CADI R-80 aircraft. Impressed with the design they became distributors for Potvin, handling marketing outside of Quebec. In 1998 Potvin expressed a desire to retire and Gilmour and Gill bought CADI, including the rights to the R-80, R-120 and L-160 aircraft designs. They renamed the company Canadian Light Aircraft Sales and Service, commonly called CLASS. Between 1998 and 2001 Potvin still produced parts, as CLASS assumed production. Potvin retired in 2001.

To preserve the CADI name the aircraft line was called BushCaddy, a play on the abbreviation and the meaning of one who carries. To expand production the company moved to larger accommodation at nearby Les Cedres, Quebec. By 2005 they had five employees with Gilmore doing the design and engineering work and Gill handling the marketing and financial aspects. Gilmore designed the Bushcaddy L-162 Max and L-164.

In about 2010 Gilmore and Gill retired and sold the company to Tony Watkin, an Australian who relocated it to Lachute, Quebec and renamed it after the aircraft line itself, Bushcaddy International Inc.

In November 2012 the company moved production to the Cornwall Regional Airport at Summerstown, Ontario and also accepted a contract with the airport to operate the UNICOM radio service.

== Aircraft ==
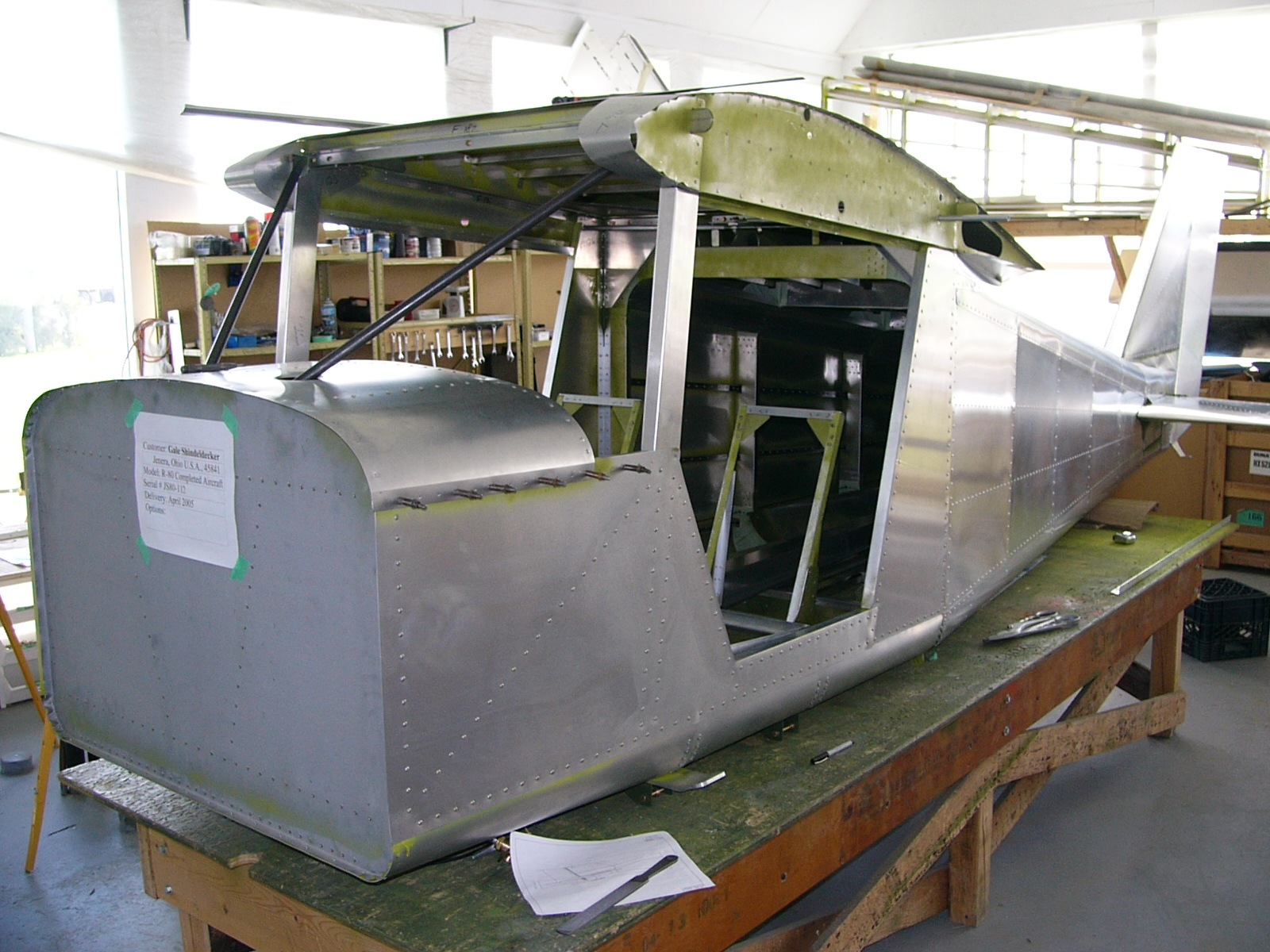
A CLASS R-80 Bush Caddy under construction at the CLASS factory in Les Cedres, Quebec, Canada.

Summary of aircraft built by CADI, CLASS and Bushcaddy
Model name	First flight	Number built	Type
Bushcaddy R-80	1994		Two seat kit aircraft
Bushcaddy R-120			Two seat kit aircraft
Bushcaddy L-160			Two/three seat kit aircraft
Bushcaddy L-162 Max	2005		Two/four seat kit aircraft
Bushcaddy L-164	c2007		Four seat kit aircraft
