= 2014 aluminium alloy =

Aluminium copper alloy used in aerospace industries

2014 aluminium alloy (aluminum) is an aluminium-based alloy often used in the aerospace industry.

It is easily machined in certain tempers, and among the strongest available aluminium alloys, as well as having high hardness. However, it is difficult to weld, as it is subject to cracking.

2014 is the second most popular of the 2000-series aluminium alloys, after 2024 aluminium alloy. It is commonly extruded and forged. The corrosion resistance of this alloy is particularly poor. To combat this, it is often clad with pure aluminium. If unclad 2014 aluminium is to be exposed to the elements, it should be painted as a corrosion protection measure.

Prior to the adoption of The Aluminum Association alloy designations in 1954, 2014 was known by the industry conventional designation "14S".

== Chemical composition ==
The alloy composition of 2014 is:

- Aluminium: Remainder
- Chromium: 0.1% max
- Copper: 3.9% - 5%
- Iron: 0.7% max
- Magnesium: 0.2% - 0.8%
- Manganese: 0.4 - 1.2%
- Remainder: Each 0.05% max
- Remainder: Total 0.15% max
- Silicon: 0.5% - 1.2%
- Titanium: 0.15% max
- Titanium + Zinc: 0.2% max
- Zinc: 0.25% max

== 2014A aluminium alloy ==
2014A is an alloy of aluminium that is very similar (but not entirely identical) to 2014. Because of the naming similarity, the two can be confused. The alloy composition of 2014A is:

- Aluminium: Remainder
- Chromium: 0.1% max
- Copper: 3.9% - 5%
- Iron: 0.5% max (versus 0.7 for 2014)
- Magnesium: 0.2% - 0.8%
- Manganese: 0.4 - 1.2%
- Remainder: Each 0.05% max
- Remainder: Total 0.15% max
- Silicon: 0.5% - 0.9% (versus 0.5-1.2 for 2014)
- Titanium: 0.15% max
- Titanium + Zinc: 0.2% max
- Zinc: 0.25% max

== Properties ==
Typical material properties for 2014 aluminium alloy are:

- Density: 2.80 g/cm^{3}, or 175 lb/ft^{3}.
- Young's modulus: 73 GPa, or 11 Msi.
- Electrical conductivity: 34 to 50% IACS.
- Ultimate tensile strength: 190 to 480 MPa, or 28 to 70 ksi.
- Thermal conductivity: 130 to 190 W/m-K.
- Thermal expansion: 23 μm/m-K.

== Standards ==
2014 aluminium alloy is discussed in the following standards:

- ASTM B 209: Standard Specification for Aluminium and Aluminium-Alloy Sheet and Plate
- ASTM B 210: Standard Specification for Aluminium and Aluminium-Alloy Drawn Seamless Tubes
- ASTM B 211: Standard Specification for Aluminium and Aluminium-Alloy Bar, Rod, and Wire
- ASTM B 221: Standard Specification for Aluminium and Aluminium-Alloy Extruded Bars, Rods, Wire, Profiles, and Tubes
