= 2319 aluminium alloy =

Aluminium copper alloy

AA 2319 (UNS A92319) is an aluminium alloy principally containing copper (5.8–6.8%) as an alloying element. It also contains ≤0.20% silicon, ≤0.30% iron, 0.20–0.40% manganese, ≤0.02% magnesium, ≤0.10% zinc, 0.10–0.20% titanium, 0.05–0.15% vanadium, 0.10–0.25% zirconium, ≤0.0003% beryllium (in arc welding electrodes) and up to 0.15% trace elements. The density of 2319 aluminium is 2840 kg/m^{3}. This alloy was first registered in 1958, in the United States.

This alloy is typically used as an arc welding electrode or filler material for use with AA 2219 workpieces.
