= Bushcaddy L-160 =

Canadian homebuilt light aircraft

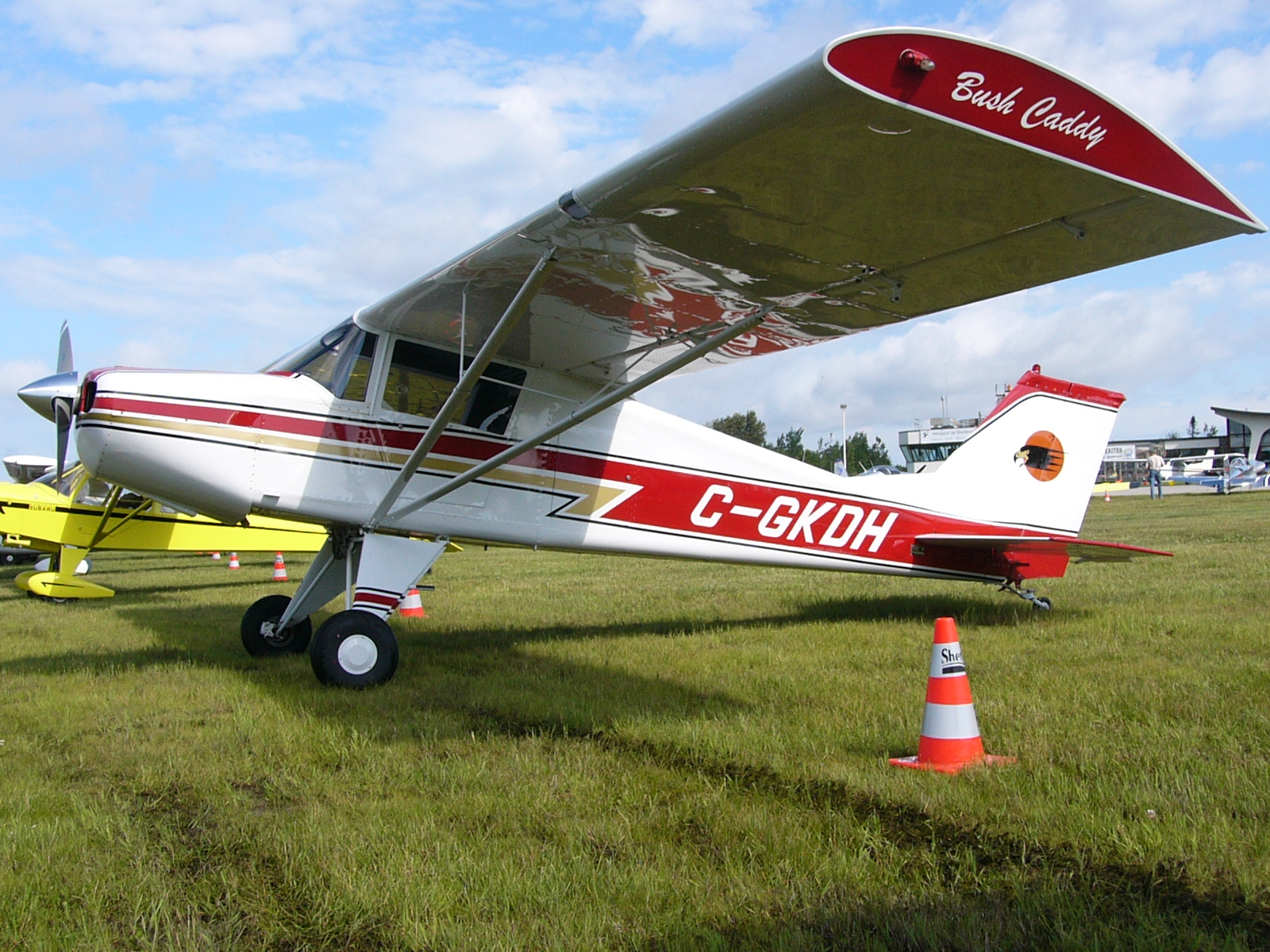
- CADI L-160 BushCaddy

General information
- Type: Kit aircraft
- National origin: Canada
- Manufacturer: Club Aeronautique Delisle Incorporated; Canadian Light Aircraft Sales and Service (1998-2011); Bushcaddy (2011-present)
- Designer: Jean Eudes Potvin
- Status: In production
- Number built: 12 (December 2011)

History
- Developed from: Bushcaddy R-120

The Bushcaddy L-160 is a Canadian kit aircraft that was designed by Jean Eudes Potvin and produced by Club Aeronautique Delisle Incorporated, Canadian Light Aircraft Sales and Service and most recently by Bushcaddy. The aircraft is supplied as a kit for amateur construction.

== Design and development ==
The L-160 was developed from the Bushcaddy R-120 and intended to provide more cargo space or room for a child seat behind the pilot and passenger seats. The designation indicates that the design engine was originally a Lycoming O-320 of 160 hp (119 kW).

The L-160 features a strut-braced high-wing, a two-seats-in-side-by-side configuration enclosed cockpit, fixed tricycle landing gear or conventional landing gear and a single engine in tractor configuration. Floats and skis can also be fitted.

The aircraft fuselage is made with a frame of welded 6061-T6 aluminum square tubing, covered in 6061-T6 sheet. Its 36 ft (11.0 m) span wing employs V-struts with jury struts. The wing has an area of 189 sq ft (17.6 m^{2}) and flaps. It can accept four-stroke powerplants from 125 to 180 hp (93 to 134 kW). Cabin access is via two fold-up doors.

Construction time for the factory kit is estimated at 1200 hours. Twelve examples were reported completed and flying by December 2011.

== Specifications (L-160) ==
Data from Kitplanes and Bushcaddy

General characteristics

- Crew: one
- Capacity: one adult passenger, plus one child
- Length: 23 ft 10 in (7.26 m)
- Wingspan: 36 ft 0 in (10.97 m)
- Wing area: 189 sq ft (17.6 m^{2})
- Airfoil: NACA 4413 (mod)
- Empty weight: 1,098 lb (498 kg)
- Gross weight: 2,200 lb (998 kg)
- Fuel capacity: 48 U.S. gallons (180 L; 40 imp gal)
- Powerplant: 1 × Lycoming O-320 four cylinder, air-cooled, four stroke aircraft engine, 160 hp (120 kW)

Performance

- Cruise speed: 115 mph (185 km/h, 100 kn) at 75% power
- Stall speed: 37 mph (60 km/h, 32 kn) flaps down
- Range: 720 mi (1,160 km, 630 nmi)
- Service ceiling: 13,000 ft (4,000 m)
- g limits: +5.3/-3.2
- Rate of climb: 1,300 ft/min (6.6 m/s)
- Wing loading: 11.64 lb/sq ft (56.8 kg/m^{2})
