= Kiro Honjo =

Japanese aircraft designer

Kiro Honjo (本庄 季郎, Honjō Kirō) (1901–1990) was a Japanese aircraft designer who worked for Mitsubishi and designed aircraft used in World War II such as the Mitsubishi G3M (Nell) and the Mitsubishi G4M (Betty).

During the American occupation of Japan following the end of World War II, Japanese companies, including Mitsubishi, were banned from producing aircraft. For this reason, Honjo began work on non-aircraft products for civilian use. For example, he designed the Mitsubishi “Cross” bicycle (jujigo), which was made of surplus duralumin left over from wartime aircraft production. Honjo also designed the winning glider used by Oka Ryoki in 1977 in the first Japan International Birdman Rally. On April 21, 1990, Honjo died at the age of 88 from prostate cancer.

He was portrayed in the 2013 Japanese animated movie The Wind Rises as a colleague of the designer of the Zero fighter, Jiro Horikoshi, going back to their days at Tokyo Imperial University. In reality, however, Honjo was senior to Horikoshi.
