= 2017 aluminium alloy =

Aluminium copper alloy

2017 Aluminium alloy has copper, iron, magnesium, manganese and silicon as main alloying elements.

== Chemical composition ==
| Element | Content (%) |
|---|---|
| Aluminum | 91.5 - 95.5 |
| Copper | 3.5 - 4.5 |
| Iron | 0.7 max |
| Manganese | 0.4 - 1 |
| Magnesium | 0.4 - 0.8 |
| Silicon | 0.2 - 0.8 |
| Zinc | 0.25 max |
| Titanium | 0.15 max |
| Chromium | 0.1 max |
| Remainder (each) | 0.05 max |
| Remainder (total) | 0.15 max |

== Mechanical properties ==
| Properties | Values |
|---|---|
| Tensile strength (annealed) | 179 MPa |
| Yield strength (annealed) | 69 MPa |
| Elongation (annealed) | 22% |
| Elastic modulus | 72 GPa |
| Shear strength (annealed) | 124 MPa |

== Thermal properties ==
| Thermal properties | Values |
|---|---|
| CTE, linear 68°F | 23.6 μm/m-°C |
| Specific heat capacity | 0.88 J/g-°C |
| Thermal conductivity | 134 W/m-K |
| Melting point | 513 - 641 °C |
