= 2024 aluminium alloy =

Aluminium alloy with copper

2024 aluminium alloy is an aluminium alloy, with copper as the primary alloying element. It is used in applications requiring a high strength-to-weight ratio, as well as good fatigue resistance. It is weldable only through friction welding because of the likelihood of solidification defects that may arise during fusion welding. Due to poor corrosion resistance, it is often clad with aluminium or Al-1Zn for protection, although this may reduce the fatigue strength. Its machinability is average. In older systems of terminology, 2XXX series alloys were known as duralumin, and this alloy was named 24ST.

2024 is commonly extruded, and also available in alclad sheet and plate forms. It is not commonly forged; the related 2014 aluminium alloy is, though.

== Basic properties ==
Aluminium alloy 2024 has a density of 2.78 g/cm^{3} (0.1 lb/in^{3}), electrical conductivity of 30% IACS, Young's modulus of 73 GPa (10.6 Msi) across all tempers, and begins to melt at 500 °C (932 °F).

== Chemical composition ==
The alloy composition of 2024 is:

- Aluminium (90.7–94.7%)
- Silicon no minimum, maximum 0.5% by weight
- Iron no minimum, maximum 0.5%
- Copper minimum 3.8%, maximum 4.9%
- Manganese minimum 0.3%, maximum 0.9%
- Magnesium minimum 1.2%, maximum 1.8%
- Chromium no minimum, maximum 0.1%
- Zinc no minimum, maximum 0.25%
- Titanium no minimum, maximum 0.15%
- Other elements no more than 0.05% each, 0.15% total

== Mechanical properties ==
The mechanical properties of 2024 depend greatly on the temper of the material.

=== 2024-O ===
2024-O temper aluminium has no heat treating. It has an ultimate tensile strength of 140–210 MPa (21–30 ksi), and a maximum yield strength of no more than 97 MPa (14,000 psi). The material has elongation (stretch before ultimate failure) of 10–25%, this is the allowable range per applicable AMS specifications.

=== 2024-T3 ===
T3 temper 2024 sheet has an ultimate tensile strength of 400–430 MPa (58–62 ksi) and yield strength of at least 270–280 MPa (39–40 ksi). It has an elongation of 10–15%.

=== 2024-T4 ===
Solution treated at foundry and naturally aged.

=== 2024-T5 ===
Cooled from hot-working and artificially aged (at elevated temperature).

=== 2024-T351 ===
T351 temper 2024 plate has an ultimate tensile strength of 470 MPa (68 ksi) and yield strength of 280 MPa (41 ksi). It has elongation of 20%.

== Uses ==
Due to its high strength and fatigue resistance, 2024 is widely used in aircraft, especially wing and fuselage structures under tension. Additionally, since the material is susceptible to thermal shock, 2024 is used in the qualification of liquid penetrant tests outside of normal temperature ranges.
