= Aluminum Association =

American trade association

The Aluminum Association
- Type: 501(c)(6) non-profit organization
- Industry: Aluminum production Aluminum fabrication Aluminum recycling
- Headquarters: Arlington, Virginia, U.S.
- Key people: Charles Johnson, President
- Number of employees: 16
- Website: www.aluminum.org

The Aluminum Association is a trade association for the aluminum production, fabrication and recycling industries, and their suppliers. The Association is a 501(c)(6) non-profit organization based in Arlington, Virginia, United States. (The Association was based in Washington, D.C. until c. 2005.)

Pursuant to seven ANSI H35 standards, The Aluminum Association registers and publishes specifications describing the composition, mechanical properties and nomenclature of aluminum alloys in the United States. These alloys are identified by the abbreviation "AA", for example AA 6061-T6.

== Before world war II ==
In 1933, Congress passed the National Industrial Recovery Act (NIRA), a New Deal measure requesting each industry to establish codes and guidelines of fair competition.

Representatives of 13 aluminum companies met in Pittsburgh, Pennsylvania to set up these codes and formed the Association of Manufacturers in the Aluminum Industry. Members of the Association included the Aluminum Company of America (Alcoa) (Arthur Vining Davis), Reynolds Metals Company (Walter Hunt), and United Smelting & Aluminum (Milton Rosenthal).

After the Act was repealed in May 1934, these industry leaders convened a special meeting in June, ultimately deciding to continue the Association of Manufacturers in the Aluminum Industry on a reorganized basis.

The Association was reorganized and renamed "The Aluminum Association," and its first official meeting was held in October 1935 in New York City. The Association defined its purpose as promoting the general welfare of the aluminum industry and its members.

Through the end of the 1930s, the Association would focus on expanding the uses of aluminum. Its first formal program in market expansion was a technical report called, “Corrosion Resistance of Aluminum Cylinder Heads,” which was distributed to engineers, automobile dealers, and repair shops.

With the onset of World War II, and aluminum's designation as a strategic material, the Association would serve as a central conduit for information relating to aluminum's use in the war effort—disseminating government material, representing the industry on government boards, and providing statistical information to the industry and the general public.

During the course of the war, the aluminum industry would design and build 52 new aluminum production and fabrication plants for the U.S. government and add on to 37 existing plants. After the war, the government-owned aluminum plants were offered to bidders under the Surplus Property Act of 1944.

== Post-war growth ==
The sale of these plants would help create Kaiser Aluminum and expand the operations of Reynolds Aluminum. Both companies joined Alcoa as major primary aluminum producers.

After the war, the Association, now with three principal divisions represented 36 companies, including all three primary producers and companies whose output represented 85 percent of the total amount of the nation's aluminum fabricated products. The three divisions were sheet, extrusion and foundry, with sheet being production of large flat aluminum pieces, extrusion being shaped profiles, and foundry being metal casting production.

By the late 1940s, the Aluminum Association would recommence fulfilling its original purpose to promote the general welfare of the industry. In doing so, it instituted a number of projects, including:

- Redirecting the efforts of the Publicity Committee, formed during the war, toward publicizing aluminum on behalf of the industry
- Initiating a program of standardization of aluminum specifications
- Creating the Foil Division
- Forming the Building Industry Committee to effect the change of the material-specified codes to performance codes—and eventually to standardize the codes across the country
- Production (in 1959) of the Aluminum Construction Manual, precursor to the current Aluminum Design Manual.

The 1950s were a period of great expansion for the aluminum industry in the building, transportation, household products, electrical, and packaging markets. The public relations program of the time promoted aluminum as “The Modern Metal for Modern Uses.”

As the demand for technical data on aluminum grew, the Technical Committee was created. In the mid-50s this committee produced the precursor to the Aluminum Standards and Data.

A promotional symbol—the "Mark of Aluminum"—was developed by the Public Relations Committee in the early 1960s. The marks, which proclaimed aluminum as variously "lightweight", "durable", "versatile", and "rust-free", would appear on thousands of consumer products to proclaim the special attributes of aluminum.

== Environmental and energy initiatives ==
The early 1970s saw the rise of the environmental movement. The industry would become heavily involved in establishing the nation's aluminum can recycling infrastructure. The Association also established new committees in energy and recycling.

In 1977, the Association would move its headquarters from New York to Washington, D.C. The Government Relations Committee formed that same year.

By the end of the decade, the Association would announce that the aluminum industry had met and surpassed its energy conservation goal almost two years ahead of schedule. The industry had reduced the amount of energy required to make a pound of aluminum by 10.77 percent compared with the base year of 1972.

As the 20th century came to a close, the Association and its members would take an increasingly active and leading role in pursuing energy efficiency and emission reductions in our primary operations. The Voluntary Aluminum Industrial Partnership,(VAIP) launched in 1995 between the Environmental Protection Agency and the aluminum industry, has since succeeded in achieving dramatic reductions in perfluorocarbon (PFCs) gas emissions. The VAIP represented 18 of the 19 American aluminum smelters and represented 98% of total aluminum smelting in the U.S. The program reduced PFC emission by 77% over 14 years. In 2002, the Environmental Protection Agency awarded its Climate Change Award to the Aluminum Association for this program.

The Aluminum Association today carries out its role in promoting aluminum via a diverse set of activities: developing technical standards and data, collecting and publishing industry statistics, promoting plant safety and health, and monitoring and promoting technological developments that advance the metal's use across a range of applications.

== Standards ==
United States' aluminum industry standards, which are voluntary, have been developed and continue to evolve to meet the need for a communication system to facilitate aluminum commerce.

The structure for this communication system is defined by a group of six American National Standards, which include the authorization for The Aluminum Association to administer the registration of chemical composition limits and mechanical properties of cast and wrought aluminum alloys, with the accompanying assignment of alloy and temper designations.

The ANS H35 standards are developed under approval by the Accredited Standards Committee H35 - Aluminum and Aluminum Alloys, which is an ANSI accredited standards committee. Aluminum Association (AA) standards are promulgated by the Technical Committee on Product Standards.

In addition to registering alloy compositions and designations, the TCPS also registers alloy-temper product standards. Most industry product standards for aluminum mill products are published in Aluminum Standards and Data, available in both customary and metric editions. Similarly, the Association publishes the Standards for Aluminum Sand and Permanent Mold Castings, which provides engineering and metallurgical standards for casting alloys in metric and U.S. units of measurements.

Aluminum Association designations and product standards information are used throughout all facets of aluminum commerce, as well as in other organizations’ codes and standards. Aluminum alloy and temper designations, chemical composition limits and registered properties in North America all originate from the above system of ANSI and AA standards. These standards are also the basis for several international agreements for the worldwide producer registration of wrought alloys, unalloyed aluminum, and aluminum hardeners (aluminum alloy materials and grain refiners).

== Aluminum Association Sustainability Initiative ==
The Aluminum Association's Sustainability Initiative, launched in April 2008, promotes increased recycling, energy-efficient product applications, and increased operating efficiency.

Among the projects that will form the basis of the initiative are:

- Expanding the Curbside Value Partnership, in which the aluminum industry is partnered with the paper, glass, plastic, and steel industries to increase curbside recycling participation and collections. As of January 2011, Curbside Value Partnership became an independent 501(c)(3) with a five-member Board of Directors and continues to grow.
- World Aluminum Automotive Sustainability—In partnership with the IAI and the European Aluminium Association, the Aluminum Association will demonstrate that aluminum automotive applications can lead to potential savings of 140 million tons of carbon-dioxide-equivalent emissions and energy savings equal to 55 billion liters of crude oil over the lifecycle of such vehicles.
