= Alclad =

Aluminum alloy used in aviation

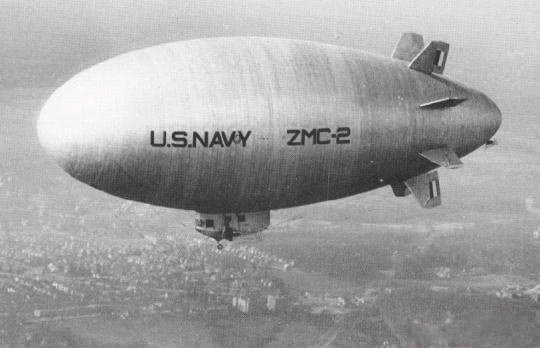
The ZMC-2 airship, the first aircraft to use Alclad in its construction

Alclad is a corrosion-resistant aluminium sheet formed from high-purity aluminium surface layers metallurgically bonded (rolled onto) to high-strength aluminium alloy core material. It has a melting point of about 500 °C (932 °F). Alclad is a trademark of Alcoa but the term is also used generically.

Since the late 1920s, Alclad has been produced as an aviation-grade material, being first used by the sector in the construction of the ZMC-2 airship. The material has significantly more resistance to corrosion than most aluminium-based alloys, for only a modest increase in weight, making Alclad attractive for building various elements of aircraft, such as the fuselage, structural members, skin, and cowling. Accordingly, it became a relatively popular material for aircraft manufacturing.

== Details ==
The material was described in NACA-TN-259 of August 1927, as "a new corrosion resistant aluminium product which is markedly superior to the present strong alloys. Its use should result in greatly increased life of a structural part. Alclad is a heat-treated aluminium, copper, manganese, magnesium alloy that has the corrosion resistance of pure metal at the surface and the strength of the strong alloy underneath. Of particular importance is the thorough character of the union between the alloy and the pure aluminium. Preliminary results of salt spray tests (24 weeks of exposure) show changes in tensile strength and elongation of Alclad 17ST, when any occurred, to be so small as to be well within the limits of experimental error." In applications involving aircraft construction, Alclad has proven to have increased resistance to corrosion at the expense of increased weight when compared to sheet aluminium.

As pure aluminium possesses a relatively greater resistance to corrosion over the majority of aluminium alloys, it was soon recognised that a thin coating of pure aluminium over the exterior surface of those alloys would take advantage of the superior qualities of both materials. Thus, a key advantage of Alclad over most aluminium alloys is its high corrosion resistance. However, considerable care must be taken while working on an Alclad-covered exterior surface, such as while cleaning the skin of an aircraft, to avoid scarring the surface to expose the vulnerable alloy underneath and prematurely age those elements.

Due to its relatively shiny natural finish, it is often considered to be cosmetically pleasing when used for external elements, particularly during restoration efforts. It has been observed that some fabrication techniques, such as welding, are not suitable when used in conjunction with Alclad. Mild cleaners with a neutral pH value and finer abrasives are recommended for cleaning and polishing Alclad surfaces. It is common for waterproof wax and other inhibitive coverings to be applied to further reduce corrosion. In the twenty-first century, research and evaluation was underway into new coatings and application techniques.

== History ==
Alclad sheeting has become a widely used material within the aviation industry for the construction of aircraft due to its favourable qualities, such as a high fatigue resistance and its strength. During the first half of the twentieth century, substantial studies were conducted into the corrosion qualities of various lightweight aluminium alloys for aviation purposes. The first aircraft to be constructed from Alclad was the all-metal US Navy airship ZMC-2, which was constructed in 1927 at Naval Air Station Grosse Ile. Prior to this, aluminium had been used on the pioneering zeppelins constructed by Ferdinand Zeppelin.

Alclad has been most commonly present in certain elements of an aircraft, including the fuselage, structural members, skin, and cowls. The aluminium alloy that Alclad is derived from has become one of the most commonly used of all aluminium-based alloys. While unclad aluminium has also continued to be extensively used on modern aircraft, which has a lower weight than Alclad, it is more prone to corrosion; the alternating use of the two materials is often defined by the specific components or elements that are composed of them. In aviation-grade Alclad, the thickness of the outer cladding layer typically varies between 1% and 15% of the total thickness.

== See also ==
- Kynal-Core, similar aluminium-clad alloys produced by ICI
- Duralumin, an aviation-related, copper-content aluminium alloy patented by its inventor Alfred Wilm by 1906
