= 6061 aluminium alloy =

Precipitation-hardening aluminium alloy

A6061
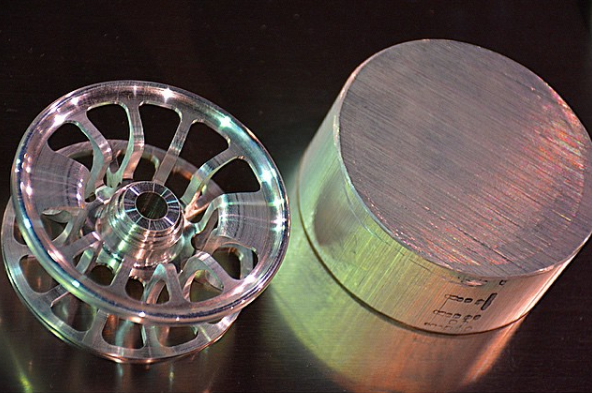
- Fishing reel machined from 6061 aluminium alloy
- Material type: Alloy

Alloy properties
- UNS identifier: A96061

Physical properties
- Density (ρ): 2.70 g/cm^{3}

Mechanical properties
- Young's modulus (E): 68 GPa (9,900 ksi)
- Tensile strength (σ_{t}): 124–290 MPa (18.0–42.1 ksi)
- Elongation (ε) at break: 12–25%
- Poisson's ratio (ν): 0.33

Thermal properties
- Melting temperature (T_{m}): 585 °C (1,085 °F)
- Thermal conductivity (k): 151–202 W/(m·K)
- Linear thermal expansion coefficient (α): 2.32×10^{−5} K^{−1}
- Specific heat capacity (c): 897 J/(kg·K)

Electrical properties
- Volume resistivity (ρ): 32.5–39.2 nOhm·m

6061 aluminium alloy (Unified Numbering System (UNS) designation A96061) is a precipitation-hardened aluminium alloy, containing magnesium and silicon as its major alloying elements. Originally called "Alloy 61S", it was developed in 1935. It has good mechanical properties, exhibits good weldability, and is very commonly extruded (second in popularity only to 6063). It is one of the most common alloys of aluminium for general-purpose use.

It is commonly available in pre-tempered grades such as 6061-O (annealed), tempered grades such as 6061-T6 (solutionized and artificially aged) and 6061-T651 (solutionized, stress-relieved stretched and artificially aged).

== Chemical composition ==
6061 Aluminium alloy composition by mass:

6061 Aluminium alloy
Constituent element	Minimum (% by weight)	Maximum (% by weight)
Al	95.85%	98.56%
Mg	0.80%	1.20%
Si	0.40%	0.80%
Fe	0	0.70%
Cu	0.15%	0.40%
Cr	0.04%	0.35%
Zn	0	0.25%
Ti	0	0.15%
Mn	0	0.15%
(others)	0	0.15% total (0.05% each)

== Properties ==
The mechanical properties of 6061 greatly depend on the temper, or heat treatment, of the material. Young's Modulus is 69 GPa (10,000 ksi) regardless of temper.

=== 6061-O ===
Annealed 6061 (6061-O temper) has maximum ultimate tensile strength no more than 150 MPa (22 ksi), and maximum yield strength no more than 83 MPa (12 ksi) for sheets and plates or 110 MPa (16 ksi) for bars, rods and wires. The material has elongation (stretch before ultimate failure) of 10–18%. To obtain the annealed condition, the alloy is typically heat soaked at 415 °C for 2–3 hours.

=== 6061-T4 ===
T4 temper 6061 has an ultimate tensile strength of at least 210 MPa (30 ksi) for sheets and plates or 180 MPa (26 ksi) for bars, rods and wires, and yield strength of at least 110 MPa (16 ksi). It has elongation of 10-16%.

=== 6061-T6 ===
6061-T6 aluminium standard heat treating process

T6 temper 6061 has been treated to provide the maximum precipitation hardening (and therefore maximum yield strength) for a 6061 aluminium alloy. It has an ultimate tensile strength of at least 290 MPa (42 ksi) and yield strength of at least 240 MPa (35 ksi). More typical values are 310 MPa (45 ksi) and 270 MPa (39 ksi), respectively. This can exceed the yield strength of certain types of stainless steel. In thicknesses of 6.35 mm (0.250 in) or less, it has elongation of 8% or more; in thicker sections, it has elongation of 10%. T651 temper has similar mechanical properties. The typical value for thermal conductivity for 6061-T6 at 25 °C (77 °F) is around 152 W/m K. The fatigue limit under cyclic load is 97 MPa (14 ksi) for 500,000,000 completely reversed cycles using a standard RR Moore test machine and specimen. Note that aluminium does not exhibit a well defined "knee" on its S-N curve, so there is some debate as to how many cycles equates to "infinite life". Also note the actual value of fatigue limit for an application can be dramatically affected by the conventional de-rating factors of loading, gradient, and surface finish.

== Microstructure ==
Different aluminium heat treatments control the size and dispersion of Mg_{2}Si precipitates in the material. Grain boundary sizes also change, but do not have as important of an impact on strength as the precipitates. Grain sizes can change orders of magnitude based upon stress and can have grains as small as a few hundred nanometres, but are typically a few micrometres to hundreds of micrometres in diameter. Iron, manganese, and chromium secondary phases (Fe_{2}Si_{2}Al_{9}, (Fe, Mn, Cr)_{3}SiAl_{12}) often form as inclusions in the material.

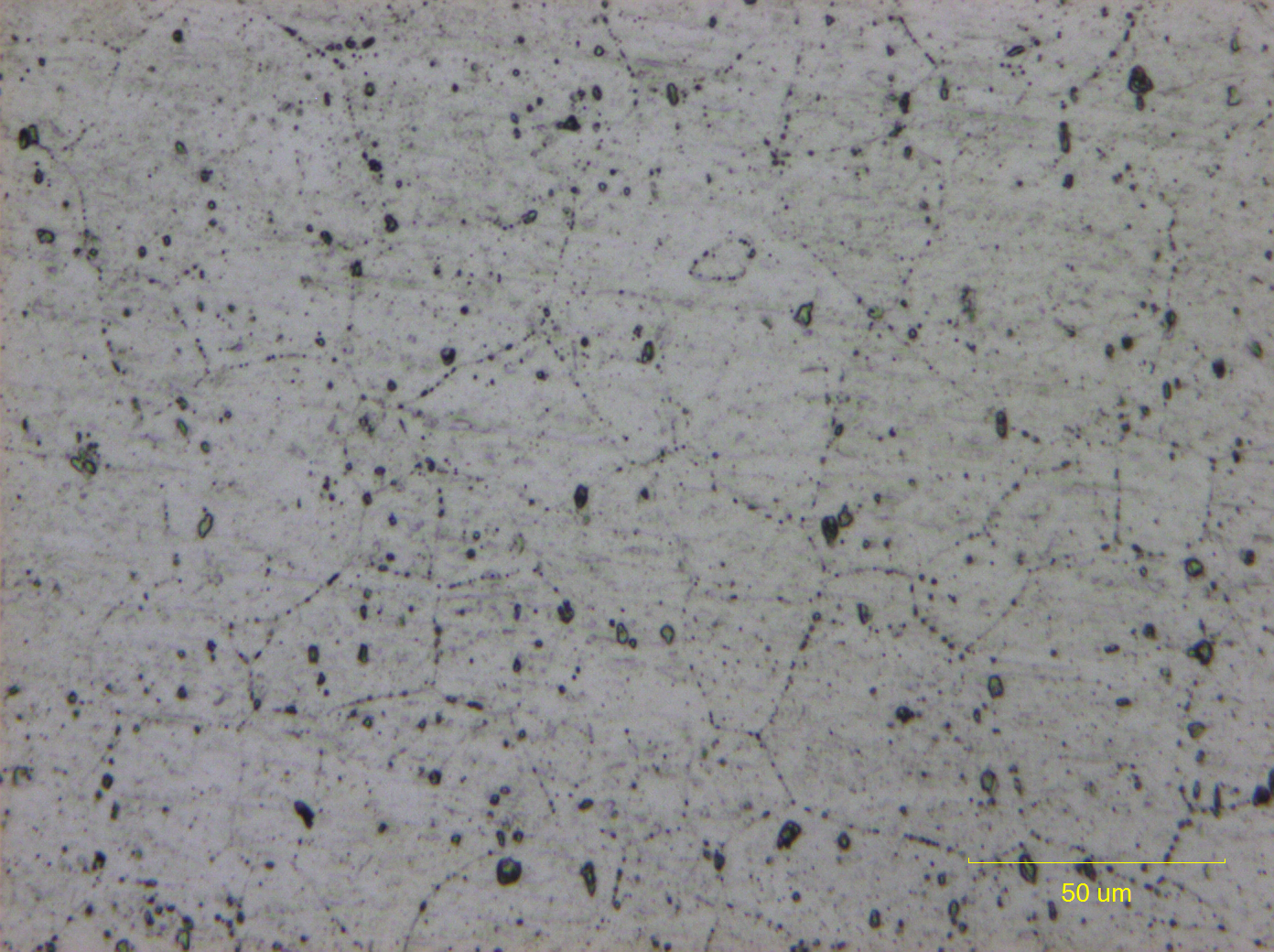
Grain boundaries in extruded plate 6061 aluminium alloy

Grain sizes in aluminium alloys are heavily dependent upon the processing techniques and heat treatment. Different cross-sections of material which has been stressed can cause order of magnitude differences in grain size. Some specially processed aluminium alloys have grain diameters which are hundreds of nanometres, but most range from a few micrometres to hundreds of micrometres.

== Uses ==
6061 is commonly used for the following:

- construction of aircraft structures, such as wings and fuselages, more commonly in homebuilt aircraft than commercial or military aircraft. 2024 alloy is somewhat stronger, but 6061 is more easily worked and remains resistant to corrosion even when the surface is abraded. This is not the case for 2024, which is usually used with a thin Alclad coating for corrosion resistance.
- yacht construction, including small utility boats.
- automotive parts, such as the chassis of the Audi A8 and the Plymouth Prowler.
- flashlights
- Scuba tanks and other high pressure gas storage cylinders (post 1995)

6061-T6 is used for:

- bicycle frames and components
- middle to high-end recurve risers
- many fly fishing reels.
- the Pioneer plaque
- the secondary chambers and baffle systems in firearm sound suppressors (primarily pistol suppressors for reduced weight and improved mechanical functionality), while the primary expansion chambers usually require 17-4PH or 303 stainless steel or titanium.
- the upper and lower receivers of many non mil-spec AR-15 rifle variants.
- many aluminium docks and gangways, welded into place.
- material used in some ultra-high vacuum (UHV) chambers
- many parts for remote controlled model aircraft, notably helicopter rotor components.
- large amateur radio antennas.
- fire department rescue ladders

=== Welding ===
6061 is highly weldable, for example using tungsten inert gas welding (TIG) or metal inert gas welding (MIG). Typically, after welding, the properties near the weld are those of 6061-T4, a loss of strength of around 40%. The material can be re-heat-treated to restore near -T6 temper for the whole piece. After welding, the material can naturally age and restore some of its strength as well. Most strength is recovered in the first few days to a few weeks. Nevertheless, the Aluminum Design Manual (Aluminum Association) recommends the design strength of the material adjacent to the weld to be taken as 165 MPa/24000 PSI without proper heat treatment after the welding. Typical filler material is 4043 or 5356.

=== Extrusions ===
6061 is an alloy used in the production of extrusions—long constant–cross-section structural shapes produced by pushing metal through a shaped die.

Cold and Hot Stamping

6061 sheet in the T4 condition can be formed with limited ductility in the cold state. For deep draw and complex shapes, and for the avoidance of spring-back, an aluminium hot stamping process (Hot Form Quench) can be used, which forms a blank at an elevated temperature (~ 550 C) in a cooled die, leaving a part in W-temper condition before artificial aging to the T6 full strength state.

=== Forgings ===
6061 is an alloy that is suitable for hot forging. The billet is heated through an induction furnace and forged using a closed die process. This particular alloy is suitable for open die forgings. Automotive parts, ATV parts, and industrial parts are just some of the uses as a forging. Aluminium 6061 can be forged into flat or round bars, rings, blocks, discs and blanks, hollows, and spindles. 6061 can be forged into special and custom shapes.

=== Castings ===
6061 is not an alloy that is traditionally cast due to its low silicon content affecting the fluidity in casting. It can be suitably cast using a specialized centrifugal casting method. Centrifugally cast 6061 is ideal for larger rings and sleeve applications that exceed the limitations of most wrought offerings.

== Equivalent materials ==
6061 Aluminium Equivalent Table

US				European Union		ISO		Japan		China	
Standard	Grade (UNS)	SAE AMS Standard	Grade	Standard	Numerical (Chemical Symbols)	Standard	Grade	Standard	Grade	Standard	Grade
AA; ASTM B209; ASTM B211; ASTM B221; ASTM B210; ASTM B308/B308M; ASTM B241/B241M	6061 (UNS A96061)	SAE AMS 4025; SAE AMS 4026; SAE AMS 4027; SAE AMS 4117	6061	EN 573–3	EN AW-6061 (EN AW-AlMg1SiCu)	ISO 209	AW-6061	JIS H4000; JIS H4040	6061	GB/T 3880.2 GB/T 3190	6061

== Standards ==
Different forms and tempers of 6061 aluminium alloy are discussed in the following standards:

- ASTM B209: Standard Specification for Aluminum and Aluminum-Alloy Sheet and Plate
- ASTM B210: Standard Specification for Aluminum and Aluminum-Alloy Drawn Seamless Tubes
- ASTM B211: Standard Specification for Aluminum and Aluminum-Alloy Bar, Rod, and Wire
- ASTM B221: Standard Specification for Aluminum and Aluminum-Alloy Extruded Bars, Rods, Wire, Profiles, and Tubes
- ASTM B308/308M: Standard Specification for Aluminum-Alloy 6061-T6 Standard Structural Profiles
- ASTM B483: Standard Specification for Aluminum and Aluminum-Alloy Drawn Tube and Pipe for General Purpose Applications
- ASTM B547: Standard Specification for Aluminum and Aluminum-Alloy Formed and Arc-Welded Round Tube
- ISO 6361: Wrought Aluminium and Aluminium Alloy Sheets, Strips and Plates
