= Aluminium–magnesium–silicon alloys =

Aluminum alloys containing magnesium and silicon

Aluminium–magnesium–silicon alloys (AlMgSi) are aluminium alloys—alloys that are mainly made of aluminium—that contain both magnesium and silicon as the most important alloying elements in terms of quantity. Both together account for less than 2 percent by mass. The content of magnesium is greater than that of silicon, otherwise they belong to the aluminum–silicon–magnesium alloys (AlSiMg).

AlMgSi is one of the hardenable aluminum alloys, i.e. those that can become firmer and harder through heat treatment. This curing is largely based on the excretion of magnesium silicide (Mg_{2}Si). The AlMgSi alloys are therefore understood in the standards as a separate group (6000 series) and not as a subgroup of aluminum-magnesium alloys that cannot be hardenable.

AlMgSi is one of the aluminum alloys with medium to high strength, high fracture resistance, good welding suitability, corrosion resistance and formability. They can be processed excellently by extrusion and are therefore particularly often processed into construction profiles by this process. They are usually heated to facilitate processing; as a side effect, they can be quenched immediately afterwards, which eliminates a separate subsequent heat treatment.

== Alloy constitution ==
=== Phases and balances ===
The AlMg_{2}Si system forms a Eutectic at 13.9% Mg_{2}Si and 594 °C. The maximum solubility is 583.5 °C and 1.9% Mg_{2}Si, which is why the sum of both elements in the common alloys is below this value. The stoichiometric composition of magnesium to silicon of 2:1 corresponds to a mass ratio of 1.73:1. The solubility decreases very quickly with falling temperature and is only 0.08 percent by mass at 200 °C. Alloys without further alloying elements or impurities are then present in two phases with the-mixed crystal and thephase (Mg_{2}Si). The latter has a melting point of 1085 °C and is therefore thermally stable. Even clusters of magnesium and silicon atoms that are only metastable dissolve only slowly, due to the high binding energy of the two elements.

Many standardised alloys have a silicon surplus. It has little influence on the solubility of magnesium silicide, increases the strength of the material more than an Mg excess or an increase in the Mg_{2}Si content, increases the volume and the number of excretions and accelerates excretion during cold and hot curing. It also binds unwanted impurities; especially iron. A magnesium surplus, on the other hand, reduces the solubility of magnesium silicide.

=== Alloying elements ===
In addition to magnesium and silicon, other elements are contained in the standardized varieties.

- Copper is used to improve strength and hot curing in quantities of 0.2-1%. It forms the Q phase (Al_{4}Mg_{8}Si_{7}Cu_{2}). Copper leads to a denser dispersion of needle-shaped, semi-coherent excretion (cluster of magnesium and silicon). In addition, there is the phase before the for the aluminium–copper alloys are typical. Alloys with higher copper content (alloyings 6061, 6056, 6013) are mainly used in aviation.
- Iron occurs in all aluminium alloys as an impurity in quantities of 0.05-0.5%. It forms the phases Al_{8}Fe_{2}Si, Al_{5}FeSi and Al_{8}FeMg_{3}Si_{6}, which are all thermally stable, but undesirable because they brittle the material. Silicon surpluses are also used to bind iron.
- Manganese (0.2-1%) and chromium (0.05–0.35%) is deliberately added. If both are allocated at the same time, the sum of the two elements is less than 0.5%. After annealing, they form a dispersion of excretions at at least 400 °C and thus improve strength. Chromium is mainly effective in combination with iron.
- As dispersion formers are coming zirconium and vanadium for use.

=== Dispersions ===
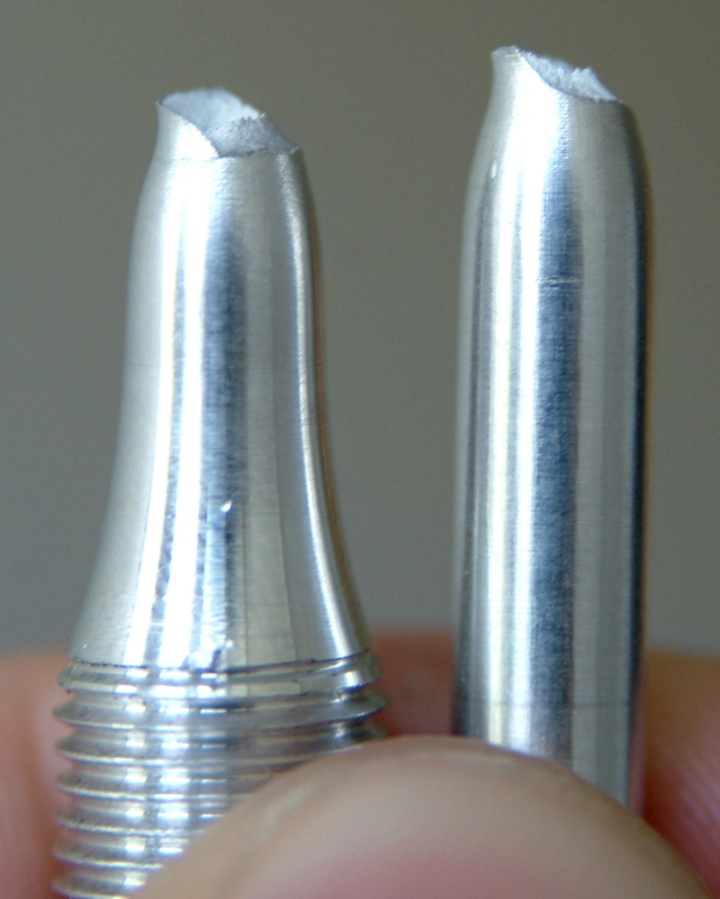
Ductile fracture of an AlMgSi alloy

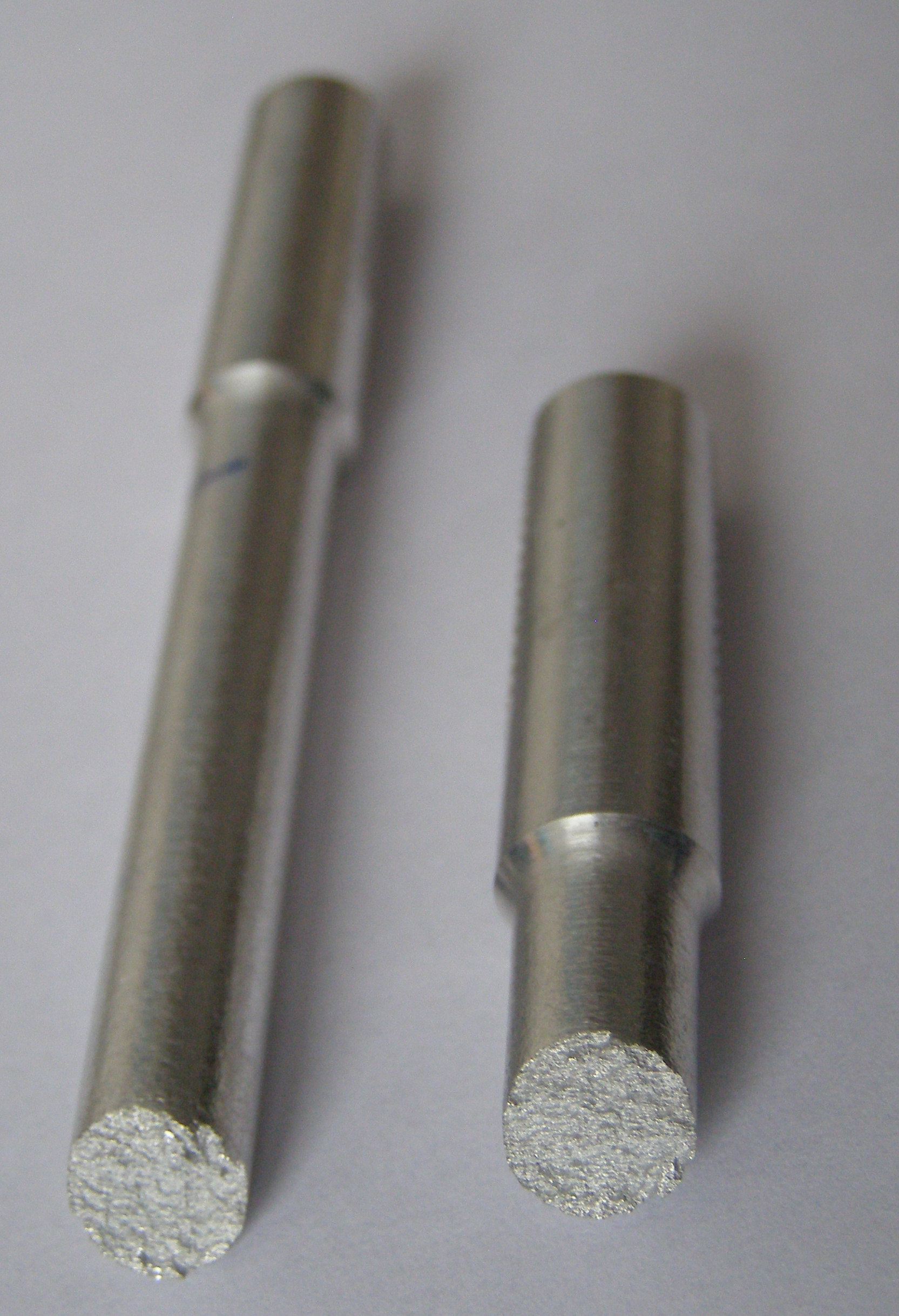
Brittle fracture of an aluminum alloy

Dispersion particles have little influence on strength. If magnesium or silicon excrete on them during cooling after the solution annealing and, thus, do not form magnesium silicide as desired, they even lower the strength. They increase the sensitivity to deterrent. However, if the cooling speed is insufficient, they also bind excess silicon, which would otherwise form coarser excretions and thus reduce strength. The dispersion particles activate further even when cured. Sliding planes, so that theDuctility increases and, above all, intergranular fracture can be prevented. The alloys with higher strength therefore contain manganese and chromium and are more sensitive to deterrents.

The following applies to the effect of the alloying elements with regard to dispersion formation:

- The strength at room temperature hardly changes. However, the flow limit at higher temperatures rises sharply, which makes theReformability is limited and above all unfavourable in the extrusion is because it increases the minimum wall thickness.
- The recrystallisation is made more difficult, which prevents coarse grain formation and has a positive effect on formability.
- Dislocation movements are blocked at low temperatures, which improved fracture toughness.
- Dispersions of AlMn bind oversaturated silicon during cooling after solution annealing. This improves crystallization and avoids excretion-free zones that otherwise arise at the grain boundaries. This improves the fracture behaviour from brittle to ductile and intragranular.
- The sensitivity to quenching increases because precipitated silicon is required for hardening. Alloys containing Mn or Cr must therefore be cooled faster than those without these elements.

=== 6000 series ===
6000 series are alloyed with magnesium and silicon. They are easy to machine, are weldable, and can be precipitation hardened, but not to the high strengths that 2000 and 7000 can reach. 6061 alloy is one of the most commonly used general-purpose aluminium alloys.

6000 series aluminium alloy nominal composition (% weight) and applications
Alloy	Al contents	Alloying elements	Uses and refs
6005	98.7	Si 0.8; Mg 0.5	Extrusions, angles
6005A	96.5	Si 0.6; Mg 0.5; Cu 0.3; Cr 0.3; Fe 0.35	
6009	97.7	Si 0.8; Mg 0.6; Mn 0.5; Cu 0.35	Sheet
6010	97.3	Si 1.0; Mg 0.7; Mn 0.5; Cu 0.35	Sheet
6013	97.05	Si 0.8; Mg 1.0; Mn 0.35; Cu 0.8	Plate, aerospace, smartphone cases
6022	97.9	Si 1.1; Mg 0.6; Mn 0.05; Cu 0.05; Fe 0.3	Sheet, automotive
6060	98.9	Si 0.4; Mg 0.5; Fe 0.2	Heat-treatable
6061	97.9	Si 0.6; Mg 1.0; Cu 0.25; Cr 0.2	Universal, structural, aerospace
6063 & 646g	98.9	Si 0.4; Mg 0.7	Universal, marine, decorative
6063A	98.7	Si 0.4; Mg 0.7; Fe 0.2	Heat-treatable
6065	97.1	Si 0.6; Mg 1.0; Cu 0.25; Bi 1.0	Heat-treatable
6066	95.7	Si 1.4; Mg 1.1; Mn 0.8; Cu 1.0	Universal
6070	96.8	Si 1.4; Mg 0.8; Mn 0.7; Cu 0.28	Extrusions
6081	98.1	Si 0.9; Mg 0.8; Mn 0.2	Heat-treatable
6082	97.5	Si 1.0; Mg 0.85; Mn 0.65	Heat-treatable
6101	98.9	Si 0.5; Mg 0.6	Extrusions
6105	98.6	Si 0.8; Mg 0.65	Heat-treatable
6113	96.8	Si 0.8; Mg 1.0; Mn 0.35; Cu 0.8; O 0.2	Aerospace
6151	98.2	Si 0.9; Mg 0.6; Cr 0.25	Forgings
6162	98.6	Si 0.55; Mg 0.9	Heat-treatable
6201	98.5	Si 0.7; Mg 0.8	Rod
6205	98.4	Si 0.8; Mg 0.5;Mn 0.1; Cr 0.1; Zr 0.1	Extrusions
6262	96.8	Si 0.6; Mg 1.0; Cu 0.25; Cr 0.1; Bi 0.6; Pb 0.6	Universal
6351	97.8	Si 1.0; Mg 0.6;Mn 0.6	Extrusions
6463	98.9	Si 0.4; Mg 0.7	Extrusions
6951	97.2	Si 0.5; Fe 0.8; Cu 0.3; Mg 0.7; Mn 0.1; Zn 0.2	Heat-treatable

== Grain boundaries ==
to the grain boundaries prefer silicon to be excreted, as it has germination problems. In addition, magnesium silicide is excreted there. The processes are probably similar to those of the AlMg alloys, but still relatively unexplored for AlMgSi until 2008. The phases excreted at the grain boundaries lead to the tendency of AlMgSi to brittle grain boundary breakage.

== Compositions of standardised varieties ==
All information in mass percent. EN stands for European standard, AW for aluminium wrought alloy; the number has no other meaning.

Numerically	Chemical	Silicon	Iron	Copper	Manganese	Magnesium	Chrome	Zinc	titanium	other	Other (individual)	Other (total)	Aluminum
EN AW-6005	AlSiMg	0.6–0.9	0.35	0.10	0.10	0.40–0.6	0.10	-	-	-	0.05	0.15	Rest
EN AW-6005A	AlSiMg(A)	0.50–0.9	0.35	0.3	0.50	0.40–0.7	0.30	0.20	0.10	0.12–0.5 Mn+Cr	0.05	0.15	Rest
EN AW-6008	AlSiMgV	0.50–0.9	0.35	0.30	0.30	0.40–0.7	0.30	0.20	0.10	0.05–0.20 V	0.05	0.15	Rest
EN AW-6013	AlMg1Si0.8CuMn	0.6-1.0	0.5	0.6-1.1	0.20 - 0.8	0.8-1.2	0.10	0.25	0.10	-	0.05	0.15	Rest
EN AW-6056	AlSi1MgCuMn	0.7-1.3	0.50	0.50-1.1	0.40 - 1.0	0.6-1.2	0.25	0.10–0.7	-	0.20 Ti+Zr	0.05	0.15	Rest
EN AW-6060	AlMgSi	0.30–0.6	0.10 - 0.30	0.10	0.10	0.35–0.6	0.05	0.15	0.10	-	0.05	0.15	Rest
EN AW-6061	AlMg1SiCu	0.40–0.8	0.7	0.15–0.40	0.15	0.8-1.2	0.04 - 0.35	0.25	0.15	-	0.05	0.15	Rest
EN AW-6106	AlMgSiMn	0.30–0.6	0.35	0.25	0.05–0.20	0.40 - 0.8	0.20	0.10	-	-	0.05	0.15	Rest

== Mechanical properties ==
Conditions:

- O soft (soft annealed, whether or not warmly formed with the same strength limits).
- T1: quenched by the hot forming temperature and cold outsourced
- T4: solution annealed and cold outsourced
- T5: quenched from the hot forming temperature and warm outsourced
- T6: solution annealed, quenched and warmly outsourced
- T7: solution annealed, quenched, hot outsourced and overhardened
- T8: solution annealed, cold solidified and hot outsourced

Numerical	Chemical (CEN)	Condition	E-module/MPa	G-module/MPa	Elongation limit/MPa	Tensile strength/MPa	Elongation at break/%	Brinell hardness	Bending change resistance/MPa
EN AW-6005	AlSiMg	T5	69500	26500	255	280	11	85	n.b.
EN AW-6005A	AlSiMg(A)	T1	69500	26200	100	200	25	52	n.b.
EN AW-6005A	AlSiMg(A)	T4	69500	26200	110	210	16	60	n.b.
EN AW-6005A	AlSiMg(A)	T5	69500	26200	240	270	13	80	n.b.
EN AW-6005A	AlSiMg(A)	T6	69500	26200	260	285	12	90	n.b.
EN AW-6008	AlSiMgV	T6	69500	26200	255	285	14	90	n.b.
EN AW-6056	AlSi1MgCuMn	T78	69000	25900	330	355	n.b.	105	n.b.
EN AW-6060	AlMgSi	0	69000	25900	50	100	27	25	n.b.
EN AW-6060	AlMgSi	T1	69000	25900	90	150	25	45	n.b.
EN AW-6060	AlMgSi	T4	69000	25900	90	160	20	50	40
EN AW-6060	AlMgSi	T5	69000	25900	185	220	13	75	n.b.
EN AW-6060	AlMgSi	T6	69000	25900	215	245	13	85	65
EN AW-6061	AlMg1SiCu	T4	70000	26300	140	235	21	65	60
EN AW-6106	AlMgSiMn	T4	69500	26500	80	150	24	45	n.b.
EN AW-6106	AlMgSiMn	T6	69500	26200	240	275	14	75	<75

== Heat treatment and curing ==
AlMgSi can be used in two different ways through aHeat treatment can be hardened, whereby hardness and Strength rise, while ductility and Elongation at break. Both begin with the Solution annealing and can also be used with mechanical processes (Forging), with different effects:

1. Solution annealing: At temperatures of about 510-540 °C, annealing is made, with the alloying elements in solution.
2. Quenching almost always follows immediately . As a result, the alloying elements initially remain in solution even at room temperature, whereas they would form precipitates if they cooled down slowly.
  - Cold curing: At room temperature, excretions gradually form that increase strength and hardness. In the first hours after quenching, the increase is very high, lower in the next few days, then only creeping, but not yet completed even after several years.
  - Hot curing: At temperatures of 80-250 °C (usual are 160-150 °C), the materials are reheated in the oven. The hardening times are usually 5–8 hours. The alloying elements thus excrete faster and increase hardness and strength. The higher the temperature, the faster the maximum strength possible for this temperature is reached, but the lower the higher the temperature, the lower.

=== Interim storage and stabilisation ===
If time passes after quenching and hot curing (so-called interim storage), then the achievable strength decreases during hot curing and only occurs later. The reasons are the change in the material cold curing during temporary storage. However, the effect only affects alloys with more than 0.8% Mg2Si (excluding Mg or Si surpluses) and alloys with more than 0.6% Mg2Si if Mg or Si surpluses are present.

To prevent these negative effects, AlMgSi can be annealed after quenching at 80 °C for 5–30 minutes, which stabilizes the material condition and temporarily does not change. The heat curing is then maintained. Alternatively, a step quenching is possible in which temperatures are initially quenched to be applied during hot curing. The temperatures are maintained for a few minutes to several hours (depending on temperature and alloy) and then completely cooled to room temperature. Both variants allow the workpieces to be processed in the deterred state for some time. Cold curing begins in the event of a longer waiting time. Longer treatment times increase the possible storage period, but reduce the formability. Some of these procedures are protected by patents.

Stabilization has other advantages: The material is then in a definable state, which allows repeatable results in the subsequent processing. Otherwise, for example, the time of interim outsourcing would have an impact on theRebound at theBending so that a constant bending angle would not be possible over several workpieces.

== Influence of cold forming ==
A transformation (forging, rolling, bending) leads to metals and alloys strain hardening, an important form of increasing strength. With AlMgSi, however, it also has an influence on the subsequent warming. Cold forming in the hot-cured state, on the other hand, is not possible due to the low ductility in this state.

Although cold forming directly after quenching increases the strength through strain hardening, it reduces the increase in strength through strain hardening and largely prevents it for degrees of deformation from 10%.

On the other hand, cold forming in a partially or fully cold-hardened state also increases the strength, so that both effects add up.

If cold forming (in the quenched or cold-hardened state) is followed by hot forming, this takes place more quickly, but the strength that can be achieved is reduced. The higher the strain hardening, the higher the yield point, but the tensile strength does not increase. If, on the other hand, the cold forming takes place in the stabilized state, the achievable strength values improve.

== Applications ==
AlMgSi is one of the aluminum alloys with medium to high strength, high fracture resistance, good welding suitability, corrosion resistance and formability.

They are used, among other things, for bumper, bodies and for large profiles in the Rail vehicle construction. In the latter case, they were largely responsible for the changed design of rail vehicles in the 1970s: previously, riveted pipe structures were used. Thanks to the good extrusion compatibility of AlMgSi, large profiles can now be produced, which then can be welded. They are also used in aircraft construction, but, there, they are AlCu and AlZnMg preferred, but not or only difficult are weldable. The weldable higher-strength AlMgSiCu alloys (AA6013 and AA6056) are used in the Airbus models A318 and A380 for ribbed sheets in the aircraft hull, where through Laser welding, weight and cost savings are possible. Welding is cheaper than the usual in aircraft construction Rivets; The overlaps required during riveting can be eliminated during welding, which saves component mass.
