= Lightweighting =

Automotive weight reduction concept

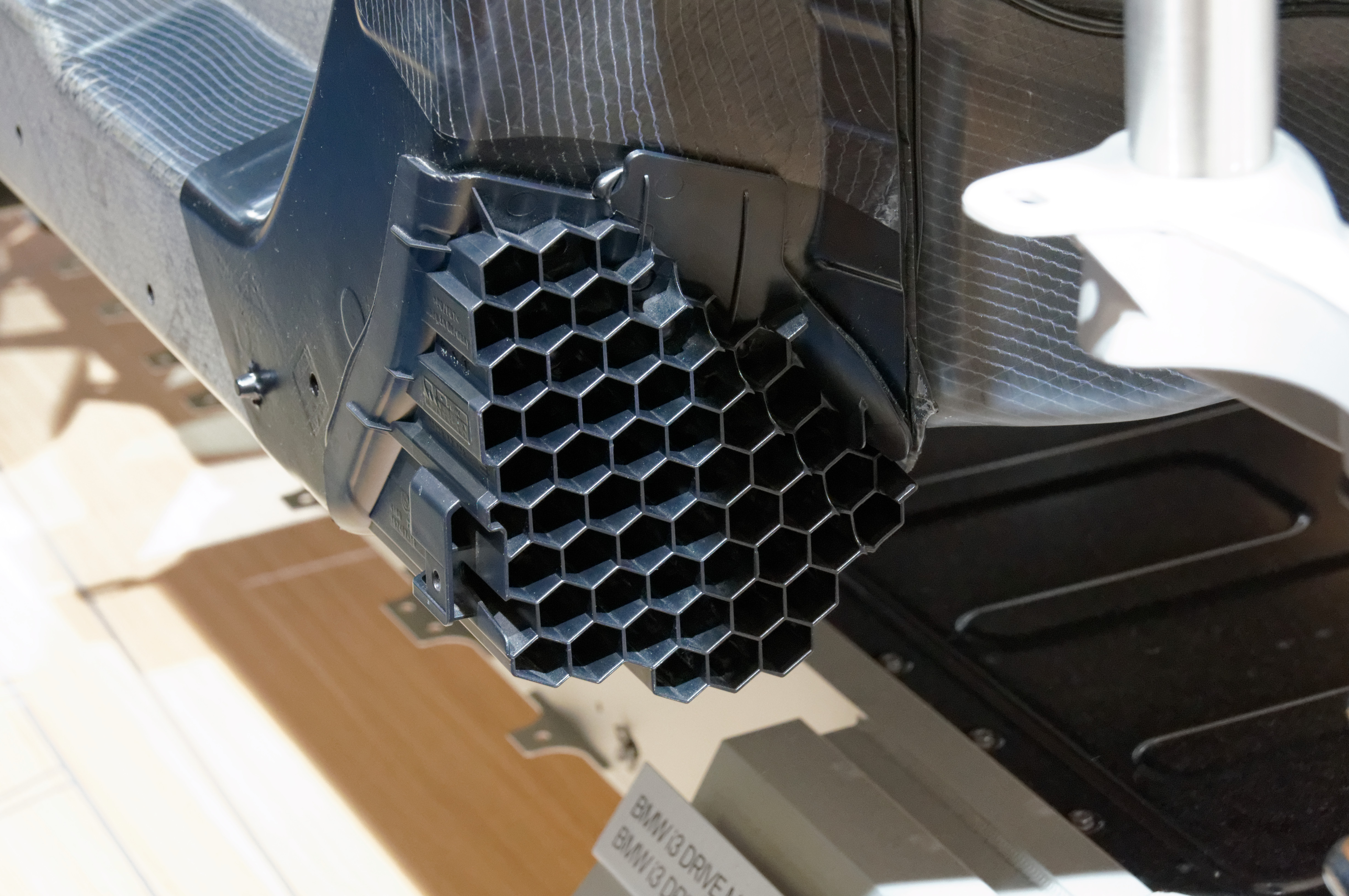
Lightweight materials such as carbon fiber are increasingly being used in cars and trucks to decrease weight while preserving strength, as shown here in this car bumper, as an example of Lightweighting.

Lightweighting is a concept in the auto industry about building cars and trucks that are less heavy as a way to achieve better fuel efficiency, battery range, acceleration, braking and handling. In addition, lighter vehicles can tow and haul larger loads because the engine is not carrying unnecessary weight. Excessive vehicle weight is also a contributing factor to particulate emissions from tyre and brake wear.

Carmakers make body structure parts from aluminium sheet, aluminium extrusions, press hardening steel, carbon fibers, windshields from plastic, and bumpers out of aluminum foam, as ways to lessen vehicle load. Replacing car parts with lighter materials does not lessen overall safety for drivers, according to one view, since many grades of aluminium and plastics have a high strength-to-weight ratio; and aluminum has high energy absorption properties for its weight.

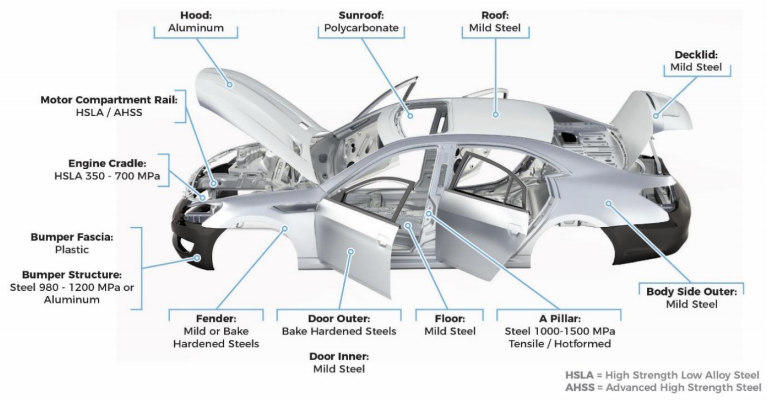
Illustration of light-weighting materials choices in car body

The search to replace car parts with lighter ones is not limited to any one type of part; according to a spokesman for Ford Motor Company, engineers strive for lightweighting "anywhere we can." Using lightweight materials such as plastics, high strength steels and aluminium can mean less strain on the engine and better gas mileage as well as improved handling. One material sometimes used to reduce weight for structures that can accept the cost premium is carbon fiber. The auto industry has used the term for many years, as the effort to keep making cars lighter is ongoing.

Another common material used for lightweighting is aluminum. Incorporating aluminum has grown continuously to not only meet CAFE standards but to also improve automotive performance. A light weighting magazine finds: "Even though aluminum is light, it does not sacrifice strength. Aluminum body structure is equal in strength to steel and can absorb twice as much crash-induced energy." The use of aluminium for lightweighting can be limited for the higher strength grades by their low formability - and in response to this forming challenge new techniques such as roll forming and hot forming (Hot Form Quench) have been introduced in recent years.

Many other materials are used to meet lightweighting goals. Cost of lightweighting, and increasingly sustainability of materials, is becoming an issue in solution selection - with the viable cost increase of a part per kilogram saved being between $5 and $15, depending on the price point and performance needs of the vehicle.
