= 6082 aluminium alloy =

Aluminium-magnesium-silicon family alloy

- Material type: Alloy

Mechanical properties
- Tensile strength (σ_{t}): 150–310 MPa
- Hardness—Brinell: 40–91

Thermal properties
- Melting temperature (T_{m}): 585–650 °C

6082 aluminium alloy is an alloy in the wrought aluminium–magnesium–silicon family (6000 or 6xxx series). It is one of the more popular alloys in its series (alongside alloys 6005, 6061, and 6063), although it is not strongly featured in ASTM (North American) standards. It is typically formed by extrusion, cold and hot stamping, and rolling, but as a wrought alloy it is not used in casting. It can also be forged and clad, but that is not common practice with this alloy. It cannot be work hardened, but is commonly heat treated to produce tempers with a higher strength but lower ductility.

Alternate names and designations include AlSi1MgMn, 3.2315, H30, and A96082. The alloy and its various tempers are covered by the following standards:

- EN 485-2: Aluminium and aluminium alloys. Sheet, strip and plate. Mechanical properties
- EN 573-3: Aluminium and aluminium alloys. Chemical composition and form of wrought products. Chemical composition and form of products
- EN 754-2: Aluminium and aluminium alloys. Cold drawn rod/bar and tube. Mechanical properties
- EN 755-2: Aluminium and aluminium alloys. Extruded rod/bar, tube and profiles. Mechanical properties
- ISO 6361: Wrought Aluminium and Aluminium Alloy Sheets, Strips and Plates

== Chemical composition ==
The alloy composition of 6082 aluminium is:

Aluminium 6082 Chemical Composition
Element	Weight Percentage (%)
Aluminium	95.2 to 98.3
Chromium	0.25 % max.
Copper	0.1 % max.
Iron	0.5 % max
Magnesium	0.6 to 1.2%
Manganese	0.4 to 1.0 %
Silicon	0.7 to 1.3%
Titanium	0.1 % max
Zinc	0.2 % max
residuals	0.15 % max

== Properties ==
Typical material properties for 6082 aluminum alloy include:

Properties of 6082 Aluminium
Properties	Value
Density	2.71 gm/cc
Young's modulus	71 GPa
Ultimate tensile strength	140 to 330 MPa
Yield strength	260 MPa
Thermal Expansion	23.1 μm/m-K.
