= Hot form quench =

Aluminium forming technique

Hot Form Quench (HFQ®) – an aluminium hot forming lightweighting technology – is an industrial stamping process for the production of deep drawn, precise and complex geometry ultra-high strength aluminium sheet components. It is the aluminium hot stamping (sometimes also called 'aluminium hot forming') process for age-hardening grades of sheet and has similarities to the press hardening of ultra-high strength steels. HFQ, the original aluminium hot stamping process, exploits viscoplasticity of aluminium at high temperatures to facilitate the production of lightweight structures, often replacing steel, composites, castings, extrusions or multiple cold formed pressings.

Hot Form Quench (HFQ) is an aluminum hot stamping process for high strength sheet (typically) 2xxx, 6xxx and 7xxx series alloys, that was initially developed in the early 2000s by Professors Jianguo Lin and Trevor Dean at the University of Birmingham and then at Imperial College London, both in the UK.

HFQ Technology Associates (the trading name of Diteven Limited), a materials technology company based in the UK, has exclusive commercialisation rights for HFQ aluminium hot forming, having acquired in 2024 the assets and know-how from Impression Technologies Limited (ITL) and Imperial College. Shortly after the first HFQ applications were adopted in automotive applications (the Aston Martin DB11) in 2016, other organisations in the lightweighting ecosystem joined Impression Technologies on a Horizon 2020 programme called LoCoMaTech with an aim to take the HFQ Technology towards mass volume applications. ITL, having installed the world's first HFQ line at the old Jaguar site at Lyons Park Coventry, licensed the HFQ Technology around the world to manufacturers, such as fischer group in Germany, EMI Aerospace in US, and Jet Wagon in China, supplying the automotive and aerospace sectors.

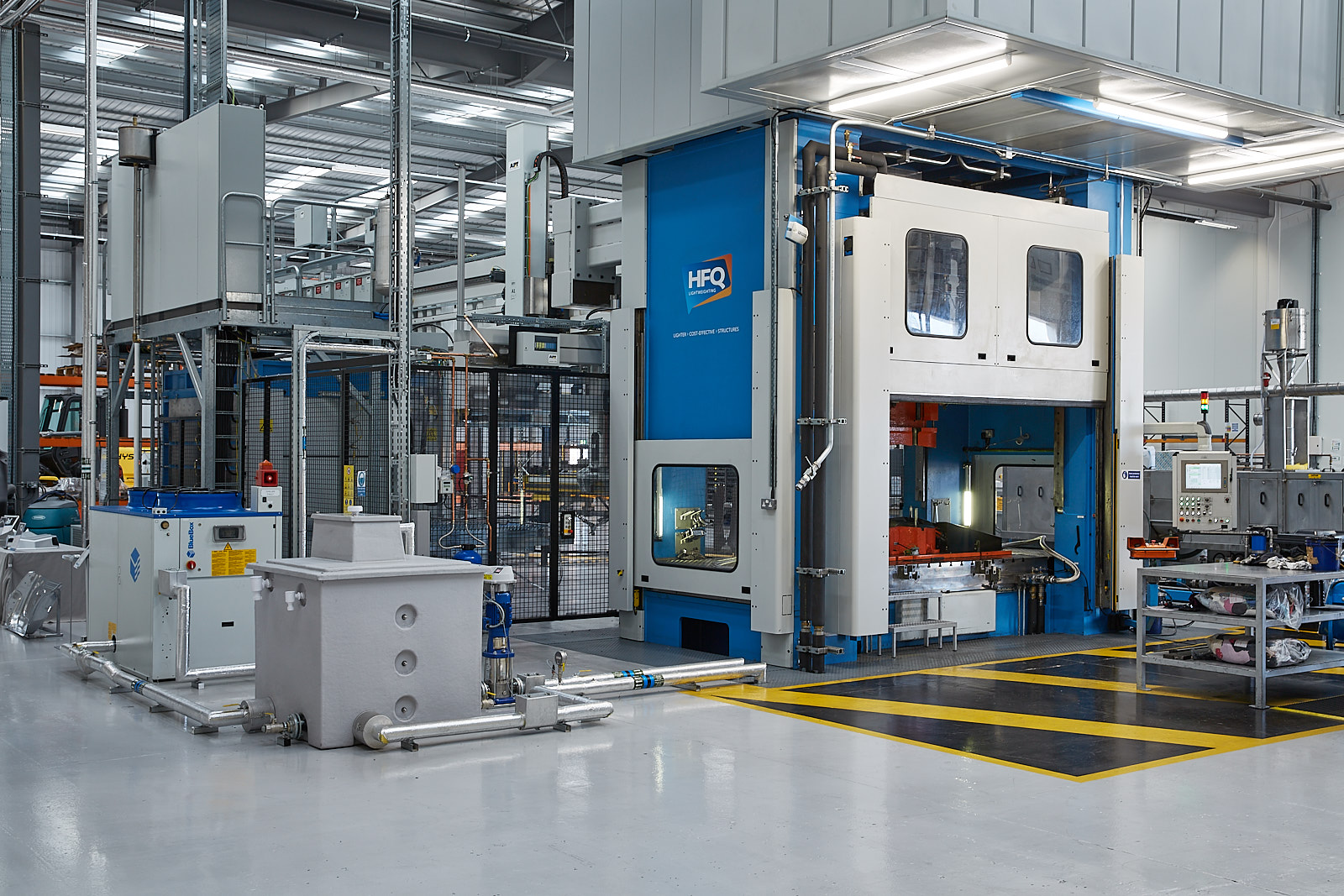
World's first HFQ production line at Impression Technologies, Coventry, UK

== Process ==
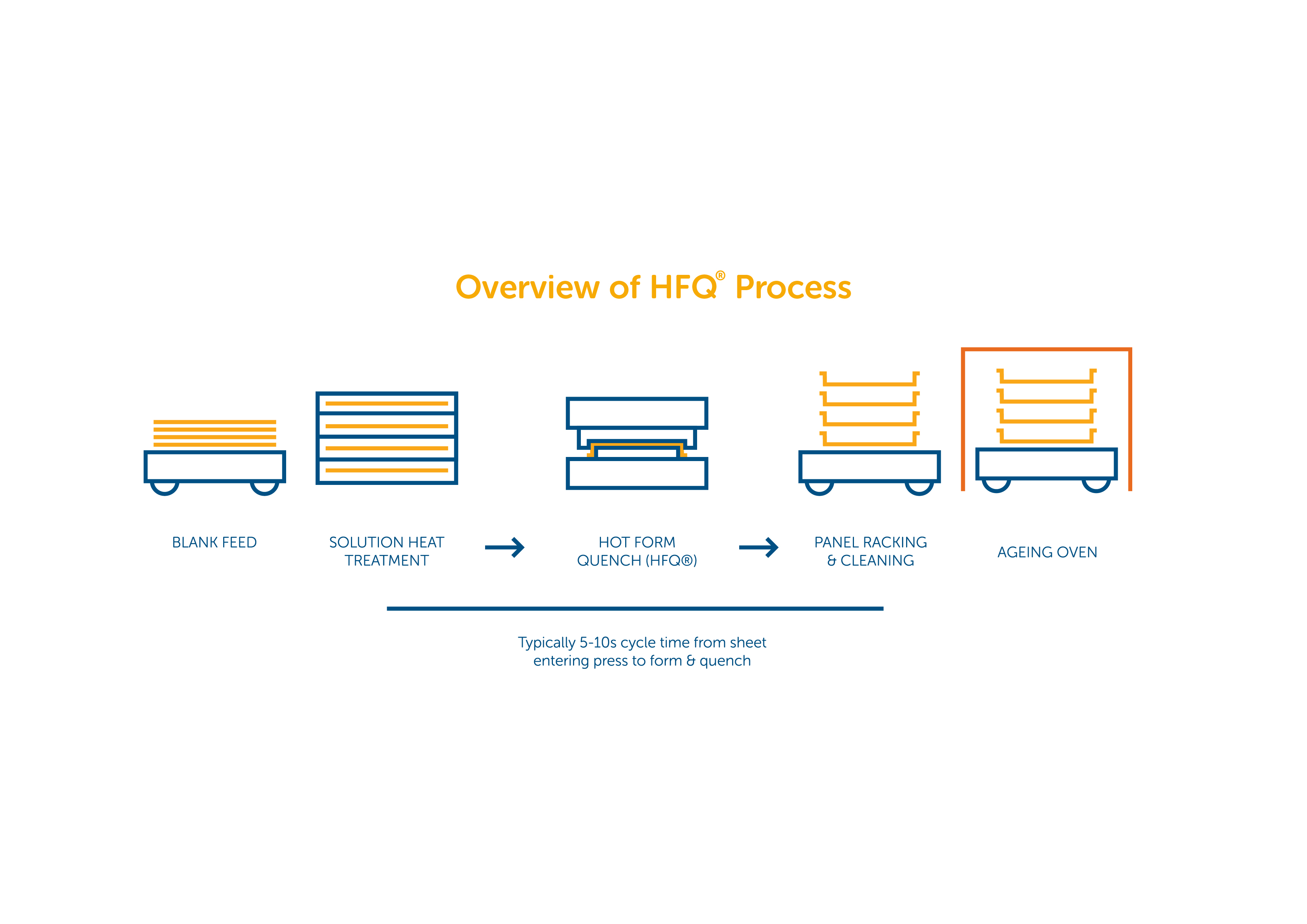
An overview of the Hot Form Quench process

Hot forming of aluminium alloys consists of four main steps performed on a custom-shaped sheet blank: heating and solutionising (above 450°C), blank transfer, quenching (to near ambient temperature in a cool die) and forming, and artificial aging. In the solutionising step, the blank is heated in a furnace to a temperature where the precipitates in the material dissolve. The solutionising ovens are most effective when designed with forced convection, which is a difference to those used for press hardened steel lines. This hot forming process is different to what is termed Warm Forming, which is performed at under 300 °C and results in less formability and finished part strength.

The pressing operation is carried out in a high speed hydraulic, servo-hydraulic or servo press in which the forming tool is cooled to create the necessary quenching to maintain the alloying elements in solid solution. The subsequent ageing process enables precipitation and increases the strength of the components to the required level, typically 300 to 500MPa yield, depending on the aluminium alloy used. Customised proprietary ageing processes have been developed to optimise corrosion performance and/or downstream joining properties

Following the HFQ process, parts can be in-die trimmed or laser trimmed as is typical for press hardened steel parts, dependant on production volume. It is usual for volumes below 10,000 parts per annum to be laser trimmed because of the high cost of the trim tooling; or for higher volumes if flexibility is required for future design changes, such as hole positioning.

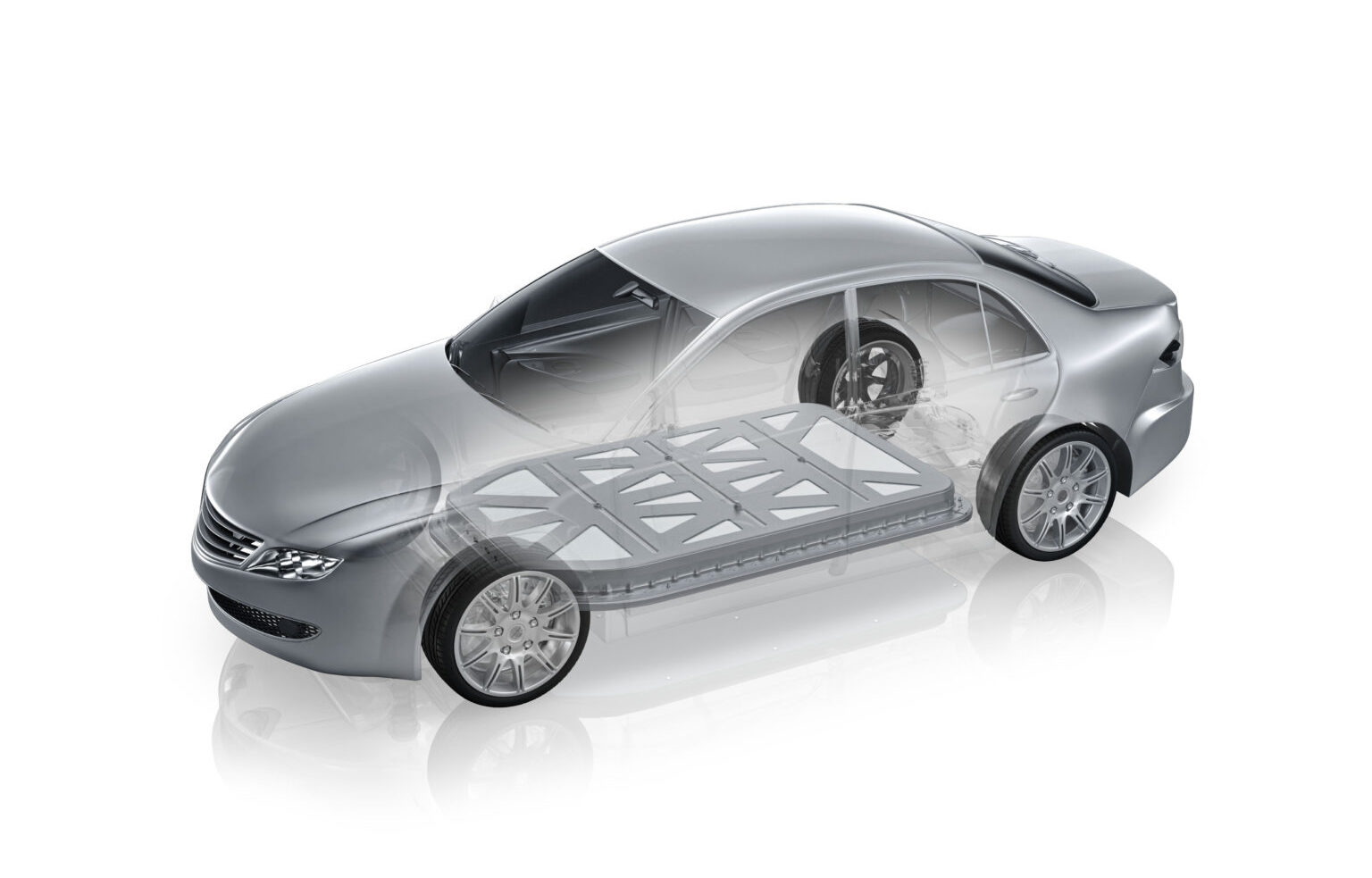
New HFQ-enabled high strength aluminium battery enclosure concept developed by FEV and Impression Technologies

Although a key benefit of the HFQ process is to enable the production of complex, deep drawn pressings in a single forming operation, it is possible to perform secondary cold pressing operations after the HFQ stage if required.

== Applications ==
HFQ is used where light-weighting and high levels of part integration are required where aluminium sheet is considered a suitable technical and economic proposition. HFQ can be a solution for applications ranging from several hundred to millions of parts per annum. Aluminium sheet thickness ideal for HFQ range from 0.8mm to 5.0mm.

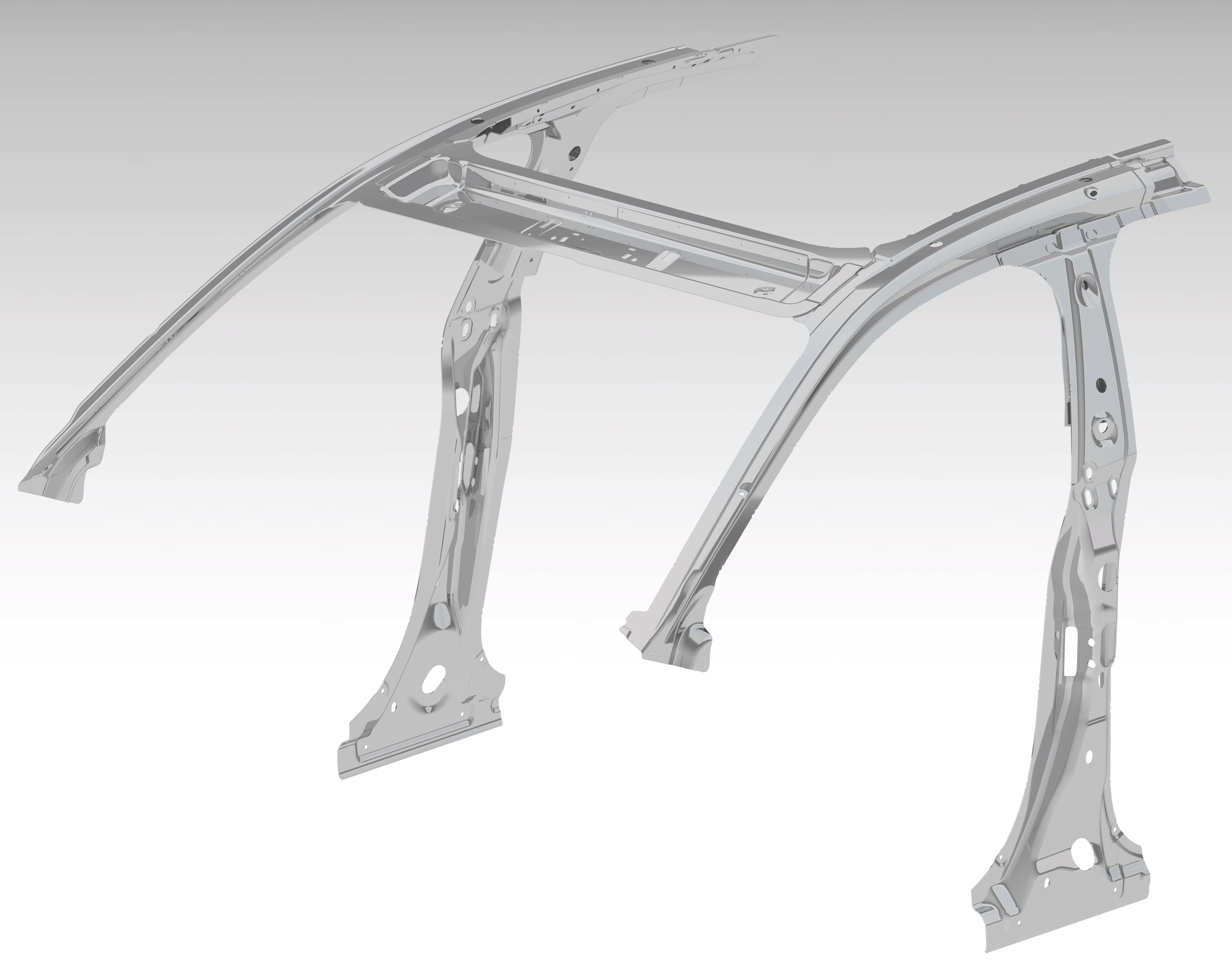
HFQ parts formed in high strength aluminium for a car body upper structure

Typical HFQ applications target Body in white (BIW) structures and closures including A and B pillars, door rings, cross members, sills, dash panels, rear quarter inners, door inners, tailgate inners and under shields. Recently there has been significant interest in the use of HFQ for battery lids and casings for electric vehicles. Alloys used for these applications include the 6x and 7x series such as 6111, 6082, 6016 and 7075.

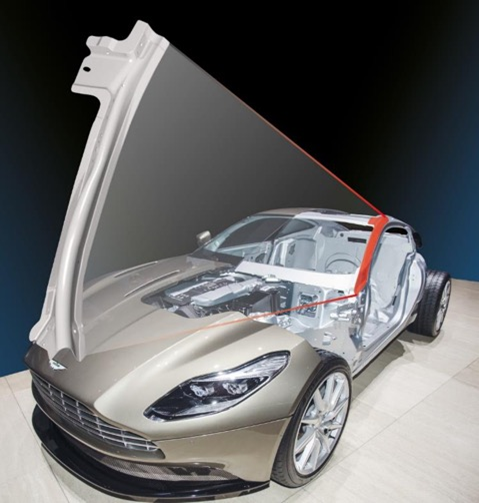
HFQ A Pillar on Aston Martin DB11

Aerospace applications are being developed that include lip skins, nacelles, fairings, wing ribs and seats. The technology, given its inherent volume scalability, may be a good candidate for mass produced drone structures. Other transportation sector applications include electric bicycle frames, motorcycles, and rail structures.

In other sectors, HFQ has been considered to replace heavy castings and machined components, currently made from aluminium where light-weighting or material utilisation are critical factors. Architectural aluminium panels requiring complex curved forms or tight radii have been considered for HFQ. There is also some interest in using HFQ for leading edges of turbines, that are subject to leading edge erosion.

A critical consideration in the design of HFQ components is ensuring that the forming simulation is accurate, which is greatly influenced by the quality of the forming material cards for each alloy and the type of lubricant used. Even aluminium alloys produced to the same specification can have different formability and end properties, depending on the supplier and the sheet processing lines used. Therefore, each grade of aluminium by supplier should be characterised with a common level of high fidelity.

== Advantages and disadvantages ==
HFQ's main advantage is superior formability for ultra-high strength aluminium alloys, that would otherwise split during conventional cold forming. This leads to extremely deep drawn parts (can be >300mm), sharp radii (r/t of 0.8 of has been demonstrated) and high levels of part integration versus cold formed pressings. In addition, HFQ enables the manufacture of parts from high and ultra-high strength aluminium, which for strength dominant applications facilitates significant weight reductions of circa 20% versus some lower strength cold formed aluminium alloys. Moreover, there is virtually no spring-back - a problem that is inherent in cold forming; with tolerances capable within +/- 0.5mm. When compared to superplastic forming, which is well-established, HFQ can offer significantly higher production speeds (of up to 5 parts per minute) and a wider range of aluminium grades. Secondary benefits of HFQ include high material utilisation (because of the need for no blank holder); and the ability to use lower cost and more widely available F-temper (as fabricated without extra heat treatment steps by sheet producer) alloy feedstocks and even use highly recycled alloys.

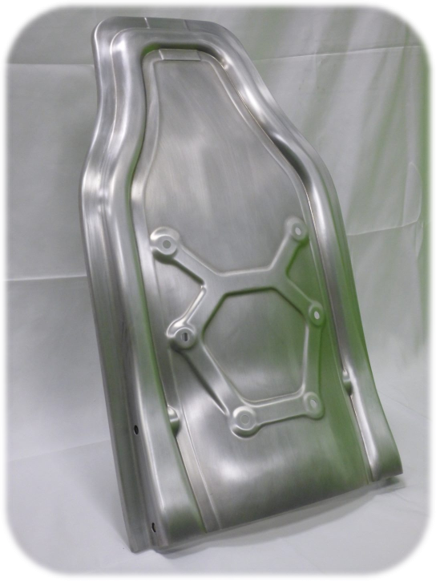
Aircraft seat back produced by HFQ Process in 6082 fully recycled alloy

The main production compromise of HFQ versus less dimensionally capable cold forming of aluminium may be a higher cycle time and the requirement for furnace investment and fast acting presses; although the technology is now being utilised for medium/high volume applications as its adoption becomes more widespread. Given that for aluminium parts produced in high volume 60-80% of the component can be raw material, once cycle times for the HFQ process are below 30 seconds, the incremental costs are relatively low versus the forming benefits.
