= Sheet metal forming simulation =

Today the metal forming industry is making increasing use of simulation to evaluate the performing of dies, processes and blanks prior to building try-out tooling. Finite element analysis (FEA) is the most common method of simulating sheet metal forming operations to determine whether a proposed design will produce parts free of defects such as fracture or wrinkling.

== Sheet metal forming challenges ==
Sheet metal forming, which is often referred to as stamping, is a process in which a piece of sheet metal, referred to as the blank, is formed by stretching between a punch and a die.

The most painful and most frequent defects are wrinkles, thinning, springback and splits or cracks. Few methods are being used around the industry to cope with the main defects, based on the experience of the technicians. However, the correct process is the most vital, since it involves the correct geometry followed by number of steps to reach at final geometry. Which demands for specific experience or higher number of iterations.

Deformation of the blank is typically limited by buckling, wrinkling, tearing, and other negative characteristics which makes it impossible to meet quality requirements or makes it necessary to run at a slower than desirable rate.

Wrinkling in a draw are series of ridges form radially in the drawn wall due to compressive buckling. Practically these are duo to low blank holder pressure due to which material slips and wrinkles formed. The optimum blank holding pressure is the key, however in certain cases it doesn't work. Then draw beads are the solutions, the location and shape of draw bead is the challenge, which can be analysed with FEA during design stage prior to tool manufacturing.

Crack in the vertical wall due to high tensile stresses, some small radius block the material flow and results in excessive thinning at that point usually more than 40% of the sheet thk. result in cracks. In some cases it may happen due to excessive blank holder pressure, which restrict the metal flow. Somewhere it might be due to wrong process design, like try to make a more deep draws in a single stage, which otherwise feasible only in two stages.

Thinning is an excessive stretching in the vertical wall due to high tensile stresses cause thickness reduction specifically on the small radius in the metal parts, however up to 20% thinning is allowed due to process limitations.

Springback is a particularly critical aspect of sheet metal forming. Even relatively small amounts of springback in structures that are formed to a significant depth may cause the blank to distort to the point that tolerances cannot be held. New materials such as high strength steel, aluminum and magnesium are particularly prone to springback.

Sheet metal forming is more of an art than a science. The design of the tooling, stamping process and blank materials and geometry are primarily done by trial and error.

Nowadays the simulation software's comes under CAE (computer aided engineering), used the finite element analysis to predict the common defects in design stage, prior to die manufacturing.

The traditional approach to designing the punch and die to produce parts successfully is to build try-out tools to check the ability of a certain tool design to produce parts of the required quality. Try-out tools are typically made of less expensive materials to reduce try-out costs yet this method is still costly and time-consuming.

== History of sheet metal forming simulation ==
The first effort at simulating metalforming was made using the finite difference method in the 1960s to better understand the deep drawing process. Simulation accuracy was later increased by applying nonlinear finite element analysis in the 1980s but computing time was too long at this time to apply simulation to industrial problems.

Rapid improvements over the past few decades in computer hardware have made the finite element analysis method practical for resolving real-world metal forming problems. A new class of FEA codes based on explicit time integration was developed that reduced computational time and memory requirements. The dynamic explicit FEA approach uses a central different explicit scheme to integrate the equations of motion. This approach uses lumped mass matrices and a typical time step on order of millionths of seconds. The method has proved to be robust and efficient for typical industrial problems.

As computer hardware and operating systems have evolved, memory limitations that prevented the practical use of Implicit Finite Element Methods had been overcome. Using the implicit method time steps are computed based on the predicted amount of deformation occurring at a given moment in the simulation, thus preventing unnecessary computational inefficiency caused by computing too small time steps when nothing is happening or too large a time step when high amounts of deformation are occurring.

=== Finite Element Analysis Methods ===
Two broad divisions in the application of Finite Element Analysis method for sheet metal forming can be identified as Inverse One-step and Incremental.

Inverse One-step methods compute the deformation potential of a finished part geometry to the flattened blank. Mesh initially with the shape and material characteristics of the finished geometry is deformed to the flat pattern blank. The strain computed in this inverse forming operation is then inverted to predict the deformation potential of the flat blank being deformed into the final part shape. All the deformation is assumed to happen in one increment or step and is the inverse of the process which the simulation is meant to represent, thus the name Inverse One-Step.

Incremental Analysis methods start with the mesh of the flat blank and simulate the deformation of the blank inside of tools modeled to represent a proposed manufacturing process. This incremental forming is computed "forward" from initial shape to final, and is calculated over a number of time increments for start to finish. The time increments can be either explicitly or implicitly defined depending on the finite element software being applied. As the incremental methods include the model of the tooling and allow for the definition of boundary conditions which more fully replicate the manufacturing proposal, incremental methods are more commonly used for process validation. Inverse One-step with its lack of tooling and therefore poor representation of process is limited to geometry based feasibility checks.

Incremental analysis has filled the role previously completed through the use of proof tools or prototype tools. Proof tools in the past were short run dies made of softer than normal material, which were used to plan and test the metal forming operations. This process was very time-consuming and did not always yield beneficial results, as the soft tools were very different in their behavior than the longer running production tools. Lessons learned on the soft tools did not transfer to the hard tool designs. Simulation has for the most part displaced this old method. Simulation used as a virtual tryout is a metal forming simulation based on a specific set of input variables, sometimes nominal, best case, worst case, etc. However, any simulation is only as good as the data used to generate the predictions. When a simulation is seen as a "passing result" manufacturing of the tool will often begin in earnest. But if the simulation results are based on an unrealistic set of production inputs then its value as an engineering tool is suspect.

=== Robustness Analysis ===
Recent innovations in stochastic analysis applied to sheet metal forming simulations has enabled early adopters to engineer repeat-ability into their processes that might not be found if they are using single sets of simulations as "virtual tryout".

== Uses of sheet metal forming simulation ==
Chaboche type material models are sometimes used to simulate springback effects in sheet metal forming. These and other advanced plasticity models require the experimental determination of cyclic stress-strain curves. Test rigs have been used to measure material properties that when used in simulations provide excellent correlation between measured and calculated springback.

Many metal forming operation require too much deformation of the blank to be performed in a single step. Multistep or progressive stamping operations are used to incrementally form the blank into the desired shape through a series of stamping operations. Incremental forming simulation software platforms addresses these operations with a series of one-step stamping operations that simulate the forming process one step at a time.

Another common goal in design of metal forming operations is to design the shape of the initial blank so that the final formed part requires few or no cutting operations to match the design geometry. The blank shape can also be optimized with finite element simulations. One approach is based on an iterative procedure that begins with an approximate starting geometry, simulates the forming process and then checks deviation of the resulting formed geometry from the ideal product geometry. The node points are adjusted in accordance with the displacement filed to correct the blank edge geometry. This process is continued until the end blank shape matches the as-designed part geometry.

Metal forming simulation offers particular advantages in the case of high strength steel and advanced high-strength steel which are used in current day automobiles to reduce weight while maintaining crash safety of the vehicle. The materials have higher yield and tensile strength than conventional steel so the die undergoes greater deformation during the forming process which in turn increases the difficulty of designing the die. Sheet metal simulation that considers the deformation of not only the blank but also the die can be used to design tools to successfully form these materials.

== Industrial applications ==
Tata Motors engineers used metal forming simulation to develop tooling and process parameters for producing a new oil pump design. The first prototypes that were produced closed matched the simulation prediction.

Nissan Motor Company used metal forming simulation to address a tearing problem in a metal stamping operation. A simple simulation model was created to determine the effect of blank edge radius on the height to which the material could be formed without tearing. Based on this information a new die was designed that solved the problem.

There are lots of sheet metal programs available in the industry as SolidWorks and LITIO. For high strength aluminium structures in 2x, 6x and 7x series grades, novel simulation algorithms have been developed via the Hot Form Quench (HFQ) technology platform, supported by an extensive library of alloy material cards; being then applied for the production of lightweight body-in-white, electric vehicle battery enclosures and aerospace structures.

FEA software, including LS DYNA, AUTOFORM, HYPERFORM, PAMSTAMP, can be used for virtual process simulations prior to product manufacturing. Defects such as wrinkles, thinning and cracks can be spotted in the design stage right before the process design, resulting in correct process selection and a reduction in lead time, potentially saving money which would otherwise one invested in multiple manufacturing iterations.
