= Press hardening =

Metalworking shaping process

Hot stamping (also known as press hardening, hot press forming, or hot forming die quenching) is a relatively new technology which allows ultra-high strength steels (typically 22MnB5 boron steel) to be formed into complex shapes, which is not possible with regular cold stamping operations. This process is commonly used for the production of automotive body in white components because its advantages align with the design criteria of modern passenger vehicles. For high strength aluminium alloys, there is a similar hot forming process, which has different metallurgical transformations - Hot Form Quench.

== Methods ==
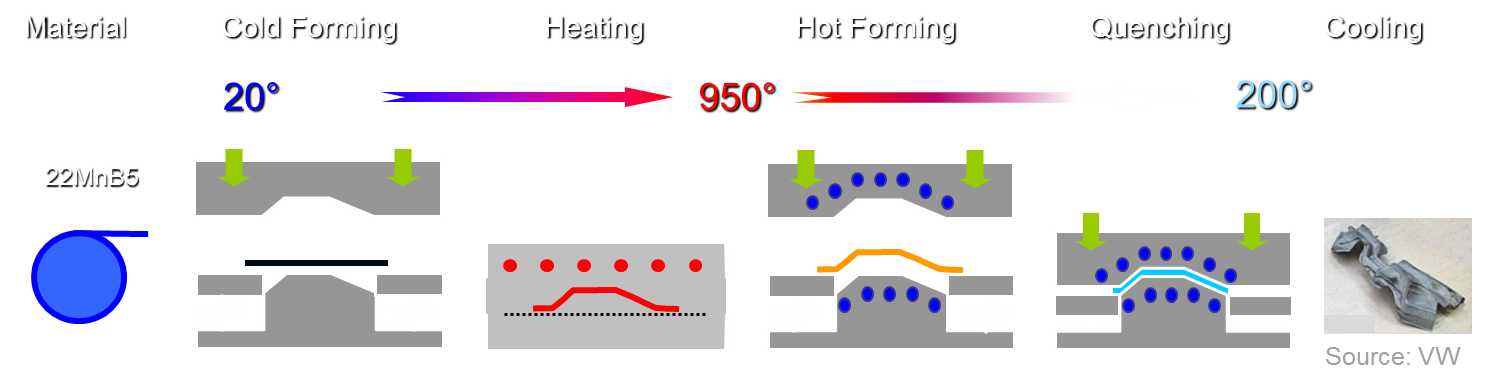
Indirect hotforming sketch

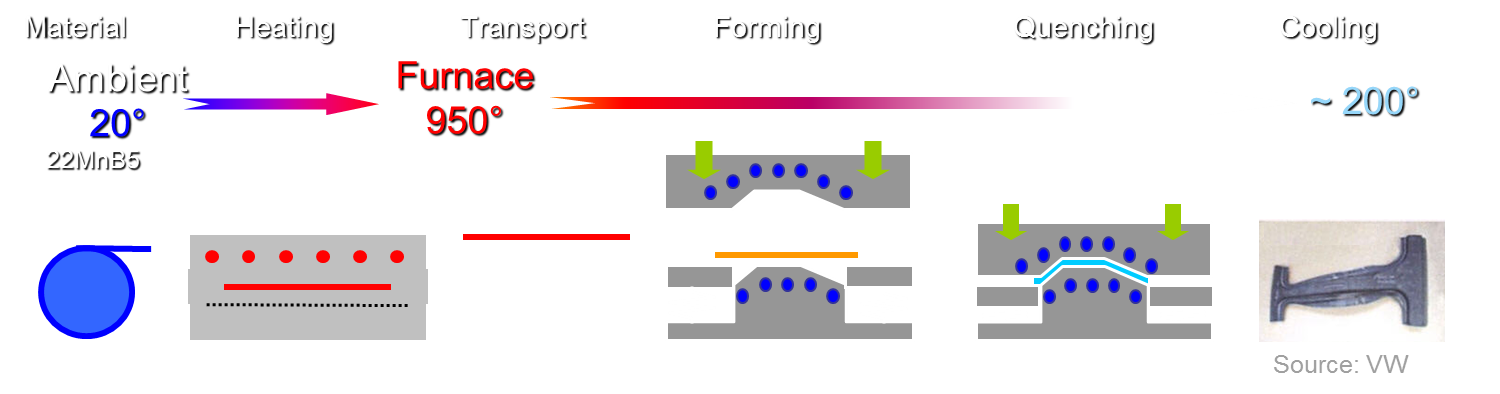
Direct hot forming sketch, Direct hot forming

Direct Process

The unformed blank is heated in a furnace, formed in hot condition (state 2 in below figure), and quenched in the die to achieve the required properties.

Indirect Process

The blank is formed, trimmed, and pierced in cold condition (i.e., state 1 in below figure). It is later heated and quenched in a die to get high strength properties.

Selection of the process depends on part complexity and blank coating (Zn based coatings typically require indirect process). In either method, the blank is formed in a much softer and formable state and is later hardened in the dies, which have drilled cooling channels. A typical hot stamped components has 1000 MPa (145 ksi) Yield Stress and 1500 MPa (215 ksi) Ultimate tensile strength. The process is undergoing constant refinement with new grades of steel emerging for hot and cold forming.

== Advantages ==
Higher strength steels may help reducing the weight by downgauging (i.e., use of thinner sheets), while increasing the crashworthiness. However, one problem with many high strength steels is that their formability is generally lower than milder grades. In addition, springback and die wear also cause problems as the forming stresses and contact pressures are higher.

== See also ==
- CNC plunge milling
