= Inlays and onlays =

Restoration procedure in dentistry

- ICD-9-CM: 23.3
- MeSH: D007284

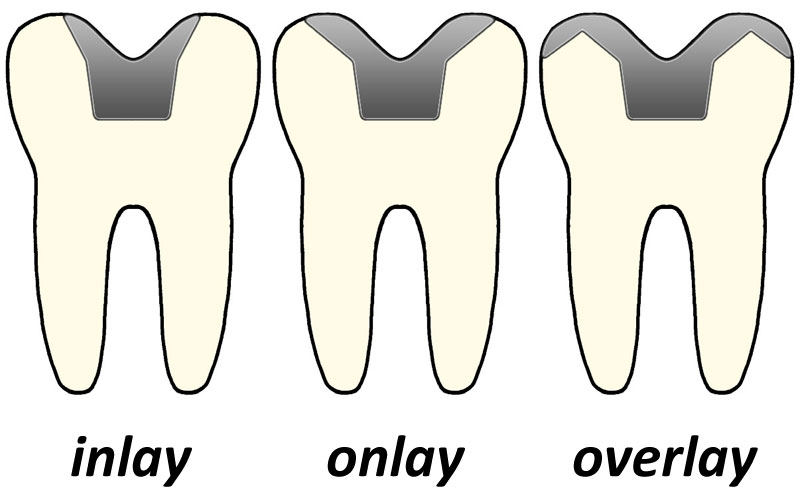
Structure of dental inlays and onlays

In dentistry, inlays and onlays are used to fill cavities, and then cemented in place in the tooth. This is an alternative to a direct restoration, made out of composite, amalgam or glass ionomer, that is built up within the mouth.

Inlays and onlays are used in molars or premolars, when the tooth has experienced too much damage to support a basic filling, but not so much damage that a crown is necessary. The key comparison between them is the amount and part of the tooth that they cover. An inlay will incorporate the pits and fissures of a tooth, mainly encompassing the chewing surface between the cusps. An onlay will involve one or more cusps being covered. If all cusps and the entire surface of the tooth is covered this is then known as a crown.

Historically inlays and onlays will have been made from gold and this material is still commonly used today. Alternative materials such as porcelain were first described being used for inlays back in 1857. Due to its tooth like colour, porcelain provides better aesthetic value for the patient. In more recent years, inlays and onlays have increasingly been made out of ceramic materials. In 1985, the first ceramic inlay created by a chair-side CAD-CAM device was used for a patient. More recently, in 2000, the CEREC 3 was introduced. This allows for inlays and onlays to be created and fitted all within one appointment. Furthermore, no impression taking is needed due to the 3D scanning capabilities of the machine.

== Inlays ==
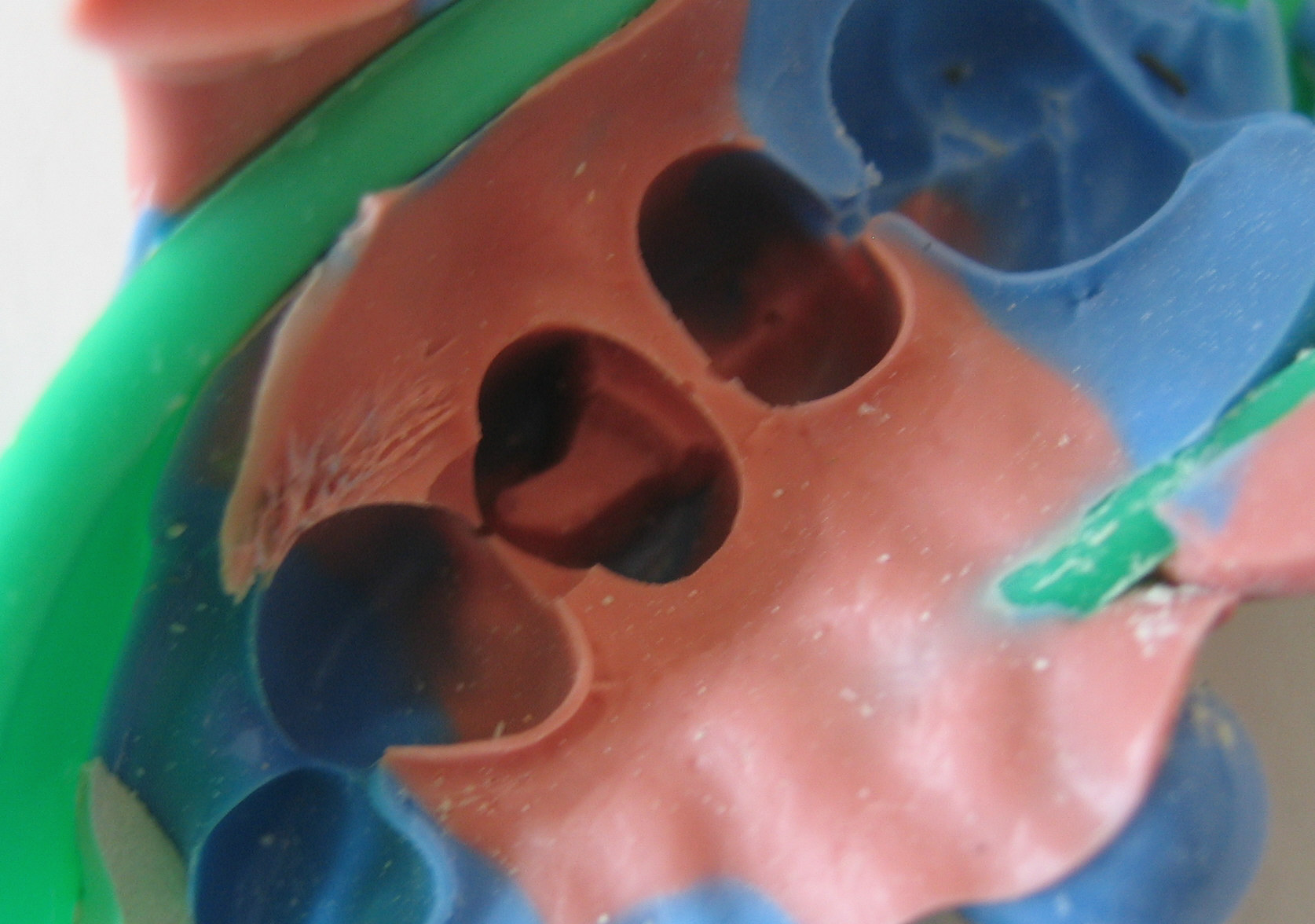
An impression of preparation for restoration with a DO gold inlay on tooth #5. The "DO" designation indicates that the gold serves as a restoration for the distal and occlusal surfaces of the tooth. This tooth was prepared and the inlay will be fabricated according to the R.V. Tucker method of gold inlay preparation. Notice how the line angles of the impression for the inlay are very sharp and precise; this is achieved using carbon-tipped stainless steel instruments. The salmon-colored polyvinylsiloxane impression material is less viscous than the blue and is able to capture better detail for the tooth being restored.

Sometimes, a tooth is planned to be restored with an intracoronal restoration, but the decay or fracture is so extensive that a direct restoration, such as amalgam or composite, would compromise the structural integrity of the restored tooth or provide substandard opposition to occlusal (i.e., biting) forces. In such situations, an indirect gold or porcelain inlay restoration may be indicated.

=== Comparison of inlays and direct fillings ===
When an inlay is used, the tooth-to-restoration margin may be finished and polished to a very fine line of contact to minimize recurrent decay. Opposed to this, direct composite filling pastes shrink a few percent in volume during hardening. This can lead to shrinkage stress and rarely to marginal gaps and failure. Although improvements of the composite resins could be achieved in the last years, solid inlays do exclude this problem. Another advantage of inlays over direct fillings is that there is almost no limitations in the choice of material. While inlays might be ten times the price of direct restorations, it is often expected that inlays are superior in terms of resistance to occlusal forces, protection against recurrent decay, precision of fabrication, marginal integrity, proper contouring for gingival (tissue) health, and ease of cleansing offers. However, this might be only the case for gold. While short-term studies come to inconsistent conclusions, a respectable number of long-term studies detect no significantly lower failure rates of ceramic or composite inlays compared to composite direct fillings. Another study detected an increased survival time of composite resin inlays but it was rated to not necessarily justify their bigger effort and price.

=== Inlay types, main uses of inlays ===
Inlays and Onlays are similar as they are a type of indirect restoration. However, the difference is that Inlays are indirect restorations which do not have cuspal coverage and are within the body of the tooth.(1) Onlays are indirect restorations that cover both body and cusps of teeth.

Inlay Indications:

- Extensively restored or weakened teeth
- Repeated fracture or failure of previous direct restoration
- Restorations within body of tooth which do not require cuspal coverage
- Difficulty achieving good contour, contact point or occlusion using direct restorations

=== Advantages of Inlays ===
Inlays are a type of indirect restoration (filling) that is used to restore extensively damaged or decayed teeth. When compared to conventional (direct) fillings, inlays have several advantages:

- Inlays are extremely strong and durable: well-made gold inlays, in particular, have exceptional longevity with proper care
- Inlays can give the restored tooth a natural, aesthetic appearance: ceramic inlays allow an excellent shade match that makes the restoration almost indistinguishable from the surrounding natural tooth
- Ceramic inlays have better physical properties than traditional resin composite fillings for posterior teeth
- Inlays may allow the dentist to achieve better contours, contact points, and occlusion than direct fillings because they are custom-made for the patient in a laboratory
- Resin inlays have less microleakage (diffusion of bacteria/oral fluids between the tooth and the filling material) and less post-operative sensitivity than direct resin composite fillings

=== Disadvantages of Inlays ===
Inlays are a hugely popular restorative technique, used in cases to preserve tooth substance and provide a greater strength than restorations. Inlays are most commonly constructed in composite resin and ceramic materials. Both types have varying properties, however the general downsides to inlays include:

- Higher cost compared to a restoration, due to the need for a dental laboratory
- Lengthier process as two appointment required i.e. increased chair time for patient
- Over time, they can present complications such as marginal leakage and staining by foods
- Tricky to ensure the absence of undercuts in the tooth preparation stage & highly technique sensitive
- Composite or ceramic inlays have a lower strength than materials such as a gold
- Risk of loss of vitality with tooth removal
- Last longer than restorations but may need replacement
- Ceramics can be brittle
- Difficult repairs

== Onlays ==
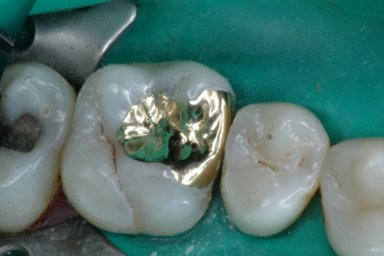
An MO gold inlay on tooth #3, the "MO" designation indicating that the gold serves as a restoration for the mesial and occlusal surfaces of the tooth

When decay or fracture incorporate areas of a tooth that make amalgam or composite restorations inadequate, such as cuspal fracture or remaining tooth structure that undermines perimeter walls of a tooth, an onlay might be indicated. Similar to an inlay, an onlay is an indirect restoration which incorporates a cusp or cusps by covering or onlaying the missing cusps. All of the benefits of an inlay are present in the onlay restoration. The onlay allows for conservation of tooth structure when the only alternative is to totally eliminate cusps and perimeter walls for restoration with a crown. Just as inlays, onlays are fabricated outside of the mouth and are typically made out of gold or porcelain. Gold restorations have been around for many years and have an excellent track record. In recent years, newer types of porcelains have been developed that seem to rival the longevity of gold. If the onlay or inlay is made in a dental laboratory, a temporary is fabricated while the restoration is custom-made for the patient. A return visit is then required to fit the final prosthesis. Inlays and onlays may also be fabricated out of porcelain and delivered the same day utilizing techniques and technologies relating to CAD/CAM dentistry.

A systemic review found that the most common cause of onlay failure is ceramic fracture, followed by ceramic de-bonding from the tooth structure, and the occurrence of secondary caries which is seen as a discolouration at the margins of the restoration. High failure rates were associated with teeth that had previous root canal treatment, and with patients who exhibit para-functional habits such as bruxism, or teeth clenching.

== Indications ==
Inlays/onlays are indicated when teeth are weakened and extensively restored. There are no obvious contrast between the two.

Inlays are usually indicated when there has been repeated breach in the integrity of a direct filling as metal inlays are superior in strength. It is also indicated when placement of direct restoration may be challenging to achieve satisfactory parameters (shape, margin, occlusion). They are usually reserved for larger cavities as tooth conservation is paramount in current practice and small cavities can be restored with direct composites instead.

Onlays are indicated when there is a need to protect weakened tooth structure without additional removal of tooth tissue unlike a crown, e.g. restoring teeth after root canal treatment to give cuspal coverage. It can also be used if there is minimal contour of remaining coronal tooth tissue with little retention.

== Contraindications ==
=== Poor oral hygiene ===
Contraindications to providing Onlays and Inlays include plaque and active caries. It is important to ensure adequate oral hygiene before providing any indirect restoration as failure to manage the caries risk of an individual may result in recurrent caries. Caries risk is defined as "a prediction as to whether a patient is likely to develop new caries in the future". The restoration itself does not alter the risk, which allows subsequent caries to develop around the indirect restoration placed. This may be caused by plaque retentive features of the restoration, or if the restoration is poorly bonded to the tooth. However, in the main the subsequent caries around a restoration is because the caries risk has not been reduced. Reducing the patients risk of further disease prior to treatment provides predictable results and helps prevent further restorative procedures.^{1}

=== Parafunctional habits and heavy occlusal forces ===
Inlays and Onlays are contraindicated in patients with parafunctional habits and heavy occlusal forces. A Parafunctional habit refers to abnormal functioning of oral structures and associated muscles, for example patients who clench or grind their teeth. Occlusal forces are greater on molars when compared to premolars. Evidence (Fuzzi and Rapelli) has shown greater failure of Onlays and Inlays in molars than premolars over an 11.5 year period. The most common cause for failure was porcelain fracture. To ensure longevity it is beneficial to avoid heavy occlusal forces. If a cuspal coverage onlay is required porcelain should be used as cuspal coverage with composite is contraindicated.

=== Patients under 16 ===
Indirect restorations are contraindicated in patients under 16 as the pulp chamber is still large and wide dentinal tubules increase the stress on the pulp. When preparing a cavity to retain an indirect restoration there is a risk of damage to the nerve supply of a vital tooth. The tooth has not fully erupted and continued active and passive eruption can cause unfavourable margins when the tooth is fully through as the patient is still undergoing skeletal development. Young children may be unable to cope with invasive dental treatment and long procedures, therefore it is advantageous to wait until they are fully cooperative.

=== Unable to tolerate impression taking ===
Patients need to be able to cope with dental impressions as these are required for the fabrication of the indirect restoration. Development of digital impression systems including Lava Chairside oral scanner by 3M, Sirona's CEREC and Cadent iTero System could help patients receive treatment if the contraindication is being unable to withstand conventional impressions. Digital impressions enable production of highly accurate models whilst eliminating patient discomfort. However, these systems are not widely available in dental practices, as of 2018.

=== Alternatives ===
If a tooth has extensive caries or tooth surface loss which would provide difficulty bonding an inlay or onlay then it might be more appropriate to consider a full coverage extra coronal restoration. This can protect remaining tooth structure. Direct restorations, for example composite may be beneficial when restorations are small. Inlays require elimination of undercuts, therefore direct restorations may preserve tooth structure whilst also avoiding unwanted laboratory costs.

== Preparation for inlays and onlays ==
The preparation of inlays and onlays mainly follows the same basic concepts of indirect restorations. The aim of tooth preparation is to preserve more tooth tissue compared to a crown preparation, while giving an adequate amount of protection to the tooth. The preparation of opposing cavity walls should be cut in a way to avoid undercuts in order to gain optimum retention from the cavity shape for the indirect restoration. For inlay and onlay preparations that are going to be completed with all-ceramic then these cavity shapes can be slightly over-tapered as most of the retention is gained from the cement lute. However, for indirect restorations using gold then the preparation shape must have parallel walls as most of the retention is gained from the cavity shape.

The process of preparation and cementation of an inlay or onlay is usually carried out over two appointments, with the preparation being carried out during the first appointment and cementation at the second. After the tooth has been prepared at the first visit a putty and wash impression should be taken of the prepared tooth to be sent to the laboratory for fabrication of the indirect restoration. Also, a provisional restoration is made using material such as ProTemp, to protect the tooth from sensitivity, loss of vitality, bacterial contamination, to prevent over-eruption of the prepared tooth and also maintains dental aesthetics for the time being.

For tooth preparation, firstly start with occlusal reduction which depending on the restorative material being used can range from 0.5mm-2mm. The best instrument to use for this is a high-speed diamond fissure bur and the reduction should follow the inclination of the cusps and grooves as this will allow the preservation of more tooth tissue. A functional occlusal bevel should be created on the occlusal loading cusp of molar teeth by holding the bur at a 45^{o} angle to the occlusal surface. This is the buccal cusp for mandibular teeth and the palatal cusp for maxillary teeth. A high-speed tapered diamond bur has the most convenient shape to prepare the buccal, lingual and proximal reduction of the tooth.

In the majority of clinical situations an inlay preparation is being made from a tooth that already has a Class II restoration and is being prepared to protect the tooth. The restoration is firstly removed and then the cavity can be converted by ensuring any undercuts are eliminated from the preparation. There are two ways this can be done, either by blocking the undercuts out with an adhesive restorative material or by removing tooth tissue to create the divergent cavity needed.

== Fabrication methods ==
There are a few methods of fabricating inlays and onlays, depending on the restorative material used.

=== Indirect restorative technique ===
The first common step is always to take an impression of the tooth preparation – either by scanning it using an intraoral scanner or by taking a conventional impression using polyvinyl siloxane.

Table adapted from a study done by Hopp et al.
Type of restorative material	Examples of system available on mMarket	Fabrication method
Feldspathic porcelain		Lost wax technique
Leucite reinforced porcelain	IPS Empress 2 / IPS e.max by Ivoclar Vivadent	Lost wax technique; CAD-CAM
Alumina core porcelain	InCeram by Vita Zahnfabrik- Germany	Slip-casting technique
Lithium disilicate porcelain	Duceram Plus by Dentsply Degussa	Lost wax technique; CAD-CAM

The details of the fabrication methods are as follows:

=== CAD-CAM ===
CAD-CAM (aka Computer Aided Design-Computer Aided Manufacture) is a fabrication method which aids the production of dental restorations e.g. crowns, bridges, inlays and onlays. It is possible for these indirect restorations to be provided in one visit. This works by first taking an intra-oral scan to produce a 3D virtual impression. The 3D image is then sent to the chosen software programme, available software programmes include CEREC Acquisition Center system (Sirona Dental Systems, Charlotte, N.C.) or the E4D Dentist system (D4D Technologies, Richardson, Texas). It is possible for the 3D image to originate from conventional casts which have been poured up in stone/plaster. The model is scanned and the 3D image is uploaded onto the software. Next, the restoration can be designed, by the software programme, on the virtual casts. Once confirmed, the milling process can begin. The milling process uses pre-fabricated blocks of restorative material, e.g. lithium disilicate or composite reinforced ceramic, to produce the end product. Finally, the restoration is sintered/glazed chair side.

=== Lost wax technique ===
There are two ways in which wax can be used to produce cast metal/ceramic indirect restorations, these are known, firstly, as the indirect wax technique using Type 1 inlay wax and, secondly, the direct wax technique using Type 2 inlay wax. For technique 1, a wax pattern is designed on the die from the cast impressions and for technique 2 the wax is packed into the tooth preparation in the mouth and adapted the shape of the cavity.

Inlay wax is chosen due to its brittleness – it breaks upon removal from undercut of a cavity, either on the die or in the mouth. In this case, this is a beneficial character as it helps us to identify the presence of an undercut which then can be removed.

Once the wax pattern is constructed the fabrication of this into the final restoration can begin, a method known as the Lost Wax Technique is used. The wax is embedded into an investment material with a sprue former – this forms a passage for molten metal to be poured through into the cylinder. The investment material must produce enough expansion to compensate for shrinkage of the metal on solidification and should be slightly porous to allow for dissipation of released gases. The container, or casting cylinder, is then placed in a furnace to burn out the wax and what is left is a hollow shape ready for molten metal to be poured into. The metal can be melted using either gas and compressed air, gas and oxygen or electric arc. Casting methods include the use of steam pressure or a centrifugal system.

Gold is an example of a material that can be used to produce inlays/onlays. Once cast a layer of oxides are present on the surface, these can be removed by placing the restoration in an ultrasonic bath for 10 minutes. This removes the oxides along with any remnants of investment material.

Possible faults at casting:

- Subsurface nodules – poor investment causing air bubbles which become filled with molten metal
- Ridges – moving casting cylinder before investment sets
- Fins – heated too quickly
- Roughness – overheating causing investment to disintegrate
- Foreign bodies
- Distorted casting – faulty impressions or casts, failure to invest wax once immediately removed from the die or insufficient heating of mould
- Porosity – presence of voids due to uncompensated alloy contraction and absorption of mould gases

=== Slip casting technique ===
This method is only applicable to sintered alumina core porcelain. Firstly, a sub-structure made of alumina powder and modelling fluid is built on the special die. w The die is then sintered by firing with the sub-structure, causing the fluid to be absorbed by the die and the alumina powder become more tightly packed.

Following sintering, the outer surface of the sub-structure is painted with lanthanum aluminosilicate glass powder. The sub-structure is porous and therefore allows infiltration of the glass powder when fired again.

Further strengthening of the material can be done by applying zirconium oxide.

=== Direct restorative technique ===
By using this technique, an impression of the tooth preparation is not required. Instead, the tooth preparation is coated with a layer of separating material such as glycerin first. Then, a composite restoration is built up directly on the preparation, allowing it to take the shape of the cavity. The restoration is then light-cured in the tooth before being removed from the tooth to be further light-cured.

Prior to cementation of the restoration onto the prepared the tooth, the layer of separating materials needs to be removed to ensure effective bonding between the tooth and the restoration.

This technique is only applicable when composite is used as the restorative material. Inlays and onlays made from ceramic or metal alloy require laboratory work and therefore can only be fabricated using indirect restorative techniques as mentioned in the previous section.

=== Survival rates ===
A study done by Rippe et al. has shown that ceramic inlays produced by the different methods, via indirect restorative techniques aforementioned, have similar longevity.

== Materials ==
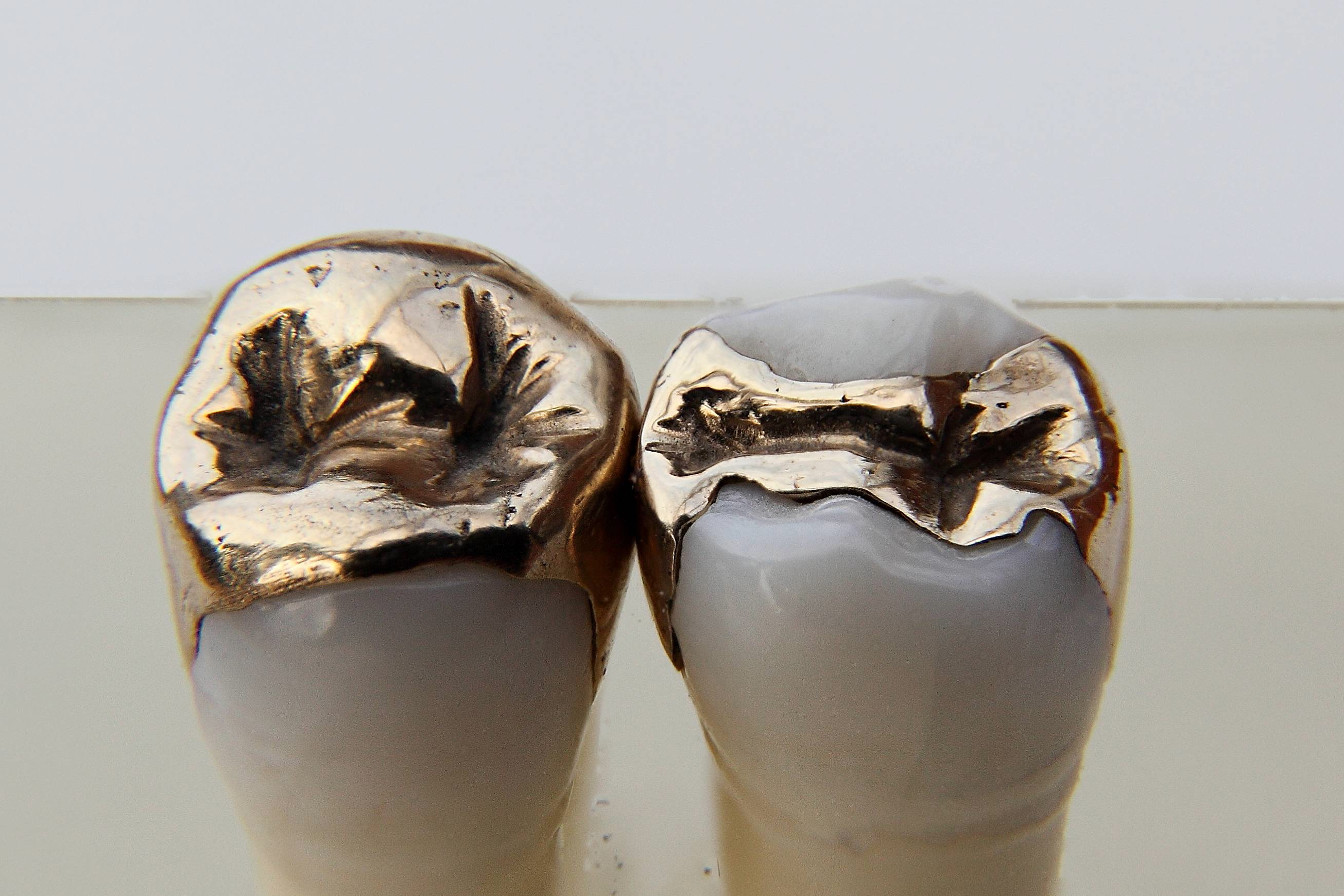
Gold Onlay [L] and Inlay [R]

=== Gold ===
The use of gold as a restorative material for the production of inlays and onlays is fading due to the increase in usage of more aesthetically pleasing tooth coloured materials. Gold has many advantages as a restorative material, including high strength and ductility, making it ideal to withstand the masticatory forces put upon the teeth. It is strong, ductile, can be cast accurately and not abrasive to opposing dentition. This property allows gold to be used in thinner cross sections, meaning less tooth tissue needs to be removed during tooth preparation compared to other restorative materials, to achieve the same strength. The tooth preparation needs near parallel wall and an absence of undercut, hence less occlusal and axial reduction. When the patient is not concerned with aesthetics, such as in posterior teeth, gold can provide the properties needed.

=== Ceramic ===
Ceramic materials began being used in restorative dentistry in the 1900s. Ceramic offers a more aesthetically pleasing restoration colour than previous gold and amalgam restorations. It is aesthetic and has high wear resistance. However, ceramic used as a restorative material without metal reinforcement have reduced strength and are more prone to failure. This is because conventional ceramics have a higher fracture risk and fractures can propagate easily under cyclical loading causing marginal ridge or bulk fracture. To compensate for this, ceramic is placed in a thicker cross-section of at least 2mm for stress bearing areas. This reduces flexure under loading and prevents crack formation. Ceramic can also be abrasive to opposing tooth surfaces upon mastication. More tapered walls are needed in tooth preparation. Undercuts can be eliminated by further tooth preparation or be blocked out with an adhesive tooth - coloured material.

=== Composite ===
Resin composite is widely used in dentistry as a direct and indirect restorative material. It comes in different compositions, variable in content and size of filler particles. Composite inlays and onlays offer great aesthetics, as a combination of different shades and opacities can be used in a layering technique, equalling or surpassing the aesthetically pleasing all-ceramic restoration. It can be easily repaired or modified as composite can bond to existing material. Using composite as a direct restoration can have a relatively high polymerisation shrinkage, but this can be avoided by using a laboratory indirect composite restoration. Due to the more in-depth curing method, using heat, pressure or strong light, this can have a lower polymerisation shrinkage. Lab made composite has reduction in polymerisation shrinkage as there is higher degree of curing in lab as compared to chair-side curing. However, fewer reactive resin groups are available to bond to the resin luting cement indicating lower accuracy in fitting compared to the other materials. However, using this indirect laboratory method demands more skill and time, and is more destructive as tooth preparation is needed prior to taking an impression. Compared to ceramic and gold inlays and onlays, composite can provide similar advantages, but a comparison of the longevity of composite is unknown.

=== Metal-ceramic ===
Metal-ceramic inlays were developed to see if the aesthetic advantages of an all-ceramic inlay restoration could be replicated, whilst improving the strength and stability of the restoration. A study showed that the fracture resistance of all-ceramic inlays was greater than that of these metal-ceramic inlays. It went on further to find that it was the taper of the inlay preparation that affected the fracture resistance more so than the choice of restoration material.

=== Zirconia ===
Zirconia, a high-performance ceramic material, has gained popularity in dental restorations due to its superior mechanical properties and biocompatibility. Zirconia inlays and onlays are particularly suitable for posterior teeth where strength and durability are paramount. The exceptional strength and wear resistance of zirconia make them particularly well-suited for posterior teeth subjected to high masticatory forces. However, their clinical success requires precise handling and preparation to ensure optimal outcomes.

== Cementation ==
Inlays and onlays are cemented in the mouth using adhesive resin luting cements. These materials are placed in the inlay/ onlay and placed onto the prepared tooth. Once the onlay/ inlay is seated, the viscosity of the adhesive resin luting cement decreases. This makes placing the inlay/onlay easier and reduces the chances of breakage.

Luting cements can have a low modulus or a high modulus. Low modulus luting cements are more flexible and withstand more force without failing. If a high modulus cement is used to cement an inlay or onlay, the restoration will not be able to transfer stresses properly into the cavity walls. With a low modulus; the cement will absorb deformations under loading and limit the pressure transmitted to surrounding tooth structures.

Composite inlays are cured by polymerisation shrinkage. Usually the composite will have been 'super cured', which means cured using temperature, pressure or light. This makes the inlay sturdier and improves wear. However, the disadvantage of super curing is that it leaves less reactive resin groups to bond to the cement and therefore the strength of bond will be less.

Preparation of inlays are with close to parallel walls and a key on the occlusal surface- this is sometimes sufficient for retention purposes so adhesive resin luting cements may not be needed.

Ceramic inlays can also be cured with chemically cured resin composite or dual cured resin composite. According to a 10-year evaluation of ceramic inlays cemented with both chemically cured resin composite and dual cured resin composite; the inlays cemented with chemically cured survived longer after cementation. After 10 years the survival of the chemically cured inlays were 100% and of the dual cured were 77%.

Bonding agents can be applied to dentine before cementation of inlays and onlays. This is something that is very useful as dentine contains a lot of mineral, which makes binding more problematic. A bonding agent that is applied straight after the preparation has been finished will give rise to greater dentine bond strengths. If the bonding agent is applied just before cementing the inlay/onlay or if no bonding agents are applied; the dentine bond strengths will be noticeably lower.

In conclusion; the type of luting agent and properties have an impact on how long ceramic/inlays will stay cemented in the mouth.
