= 6262 aluminium alloy =

6262 aluminium alloy is an alloy in the wrought aluminium-magnesium-silicon family (6000 or 6xxx series). It is related to 6162 aluminium alloy (Aluminum Association designations that only differ in the second digit are variations on the same alloy), but sees much more widespread use. It is notably distinct from 6162, and most other aluminium alloys, in that it contains lead in its alloy composition. It is typically formed by extrusion, forging, or rolling, but as a wrought alloy it is not used in casting. It can also be clad, but that is not common practice with this alloy. It cannot be work hardened, but is commonly heat treated to produce tempers with a higher strength but lower ductility.

Alternate names and designations for this alloy include AlMg1SiPb and A96262. The alloy and its various tempers are covered by the following standards:

- ASTM B 210: Standard Specification for Aluminium and Aluminium-Alloy Drawn Seamless Tubes
- ASTM B 211: Standard Specification for Aluminium and Aluminium-Alloy Bar, Rod, and Wire
- ASTM B 221: Standard Specification for Aluminium and Aluminium-Alloy Extruded Bars, Rods, Wire, Profiles, and Tubes
- ASTM B 483: Standard Specification for Aluminium and Aluminium-Alloy Drawn Tube and Pipe for General Purpose Applications
- EN 573-3: Aluminium and aluminium alloys. Chemical composition and form of wrought products. Chemical composition and form of products
- EN 754-2: Aluminium and aluminium alloys. Cold drawn rod/bar and tube. Mechanical properties
- EN 755-2: Aluminium and aluminium alloys. Extruded rod/bar, tube and profiles. Mechanical properties

== Chemical composition ==
The alloy composition of 6262 aluminium is:

- Aluminium: 94.7 to 97.8%
- Bismuth: 0.4 to 0.7%
- Chromium: 0.04 to 0.14%
- Copper: 0.15 to 0.40%
- Iron: 0.7% max
- Lead: 0.4 to 0.7%
- Magnesium: 0.8 to 1.2%
- Manganese: 0.15%
- Silicon: 0.4 to 0.8%
- Titanium: 0.15% max
- Zinc: 0.25% max
- Residuals: 0.15% max

== Properties ==
Typical material properties for 6262 aluminium alloy include:

- Density: 2.72 g/cm^{3}, or 170 lb/ft^{3}.
- Electrical conductivity: 44% IACS.
- Young's modulus: 69 GPa, or 10 Msi.
- Ultimate tensile strength: 280 to 390 MPa, or 41 to 57 ksi.
- Yield strength: 260 to 360 MPa, or 38 to 52 ksi.
- Thermal expansion: 21.8 μm/m-K.
- Solidus: 582 °C or 1080 °F.
