= 6060 aluminium alloy =

Alloy in which aluminium is the predominant metal

6060 aluminium alloy is an alloy in the wrought aluminium-magnesium-silicon family (6000 or 6xxx series). It is much more closely related to the alloy 6063 than to 6061. The main difference between 6060 and 6063 is that 6063 has a slightly higher magnesium content. It can be formed by extrusion, forging or rolling, but as a wrought alloy it is not used in casting. It cannot be work hardened, but is commonly heat treated to produce tempers with a higher strength but lower ductility.

Alternate names and designations include AlMgSi, 3.3206, and A96060. The alloy and its various tempers are covered by the following standards:

- ASTM B 221: Standard Specification for Aluminum and Aluminum-Alloy Extruded Bars, Rods, Wire, Profiles, and Tubes
- EN 573-3: Aluminium and aluminium alloys. Chemical composition and form of wrought products. Chemical composition and form of products
- EN 754-2: Aluminium and aluminium alloys. Cold drawn rod/bar and tube. Mechanical properties
- EN 755-2: Aluminium and aluminium alloys. Extruded rod/bar, tube and profiles. Mechanical properties
- ISO 6361: Wrought Aluminium and Aluminium Alloy Sheets, Strips and Plates

== Chemical composition ==
The alloy composition of 6060 aluminium is:

- Aluminium: 97.9 to 99.3%
- Chromium: 0.05% max
- Copper: 0.1% max
- Iron: 0.1 to 0.3%
- Magnesium: 0.35 to 0.5%
- Manganese: 0.10%
- Silicon: 0.3 to 0.6%
- Titanium: 0.1% max
- Zinc: 0.15% max
- Residuals: 0.15% max

== Properties ==
Typical material properties for 6060 aluminum alloy include:

- Density: 2.710 g/cm^{3}, or 169 lb/ft^{3}.
- Young's modulus: 70 GPa, or 10 Msi, or 303 EMEC
- Ultimate tensile strength: 140 to 230 MPa, or 20 to 33 ksi.
- Yield strength: 70 to 180 MPa, or 10 to 26 ksi.
- Thermal Expansion: 23.4 μm/m-K.
- Solidus: 610 °C or 1130 °F.
