= 6162 aluminium alloy =

6162 aluminium alloy is an alloy in the wrought aluminium-magnesium-silicon family (6000 or 6xxx series). It is related to 6262 aluminium alloy in that Aluminum Association designations that only differ in the second digit are variations on the same alloy. It is similar to 6105 aluminium alloy, both in alloy composition and the fact that it is only really used in extrusions. However, as a wrought alloy, it can also be formed by rolling, forging, and similar processes, should the need arise. It is supplied in heat treated form. It can be referred to by the UNS designation A96162, and is covered by the standard ASTM B221: Standard Specification for Aluminum and Aluminum-Alloy Extruded Bars, Rods, Wire, Profiles, and Tubes.

== Chemical composition ==
The alloy composition of 6162 aluminium is:

- Aluminium: 96.7 to 98.9%
- Chromium: 0.1% max
- Copper: 0.2% max
- Iron: 0.5% max
- Magnesium: 0.7 to 1.1%
- Manganese: 0.1% max
- Silicon: 0.4 to 0.8%
- Titanium: 0.1% max
- Zinc: 0.25% max
- Residuals: 0.15% max

== Properties ==
Typical material properties for 6162 aluminum alloy include:

- Density: 2.70 g/cm^{3}, or 169 lb/ft^{3}.
- Young's modulus: 70 GPa, or 10 Msi.
- Ultimate tensile strength: 280 to 290 MPa, or 41 to 42 ksi.
- Yield strength: 260 to 270 MPa, or 38 to 39 ksi.
- Thermal Expansion: 21.9 μm/m-K.
