= 6009 aluminium alloy =

6009 Aluminium alloy has minor elements as silicon, iron, magnesium, zinc, manganese, copper, chromium, and titanium.

== Chemical Composition ==
Element	Weight Percentage (%)
Aluminum	95.7 - 98.7
Silicon	0.60 - 1
Iron	≤ 0.50
Magnesium	0.40 - 0.80
Zinc	≤ 0.25
Manganese	0.20 - 0.80
Copper	0.15 - 0.60
Chromium	≤ 0.10
Titanium	≤ 0.10
Remainder (each)	≤ 0.050
Remainder (total)	≤ 0.15

== Mechanical Properties ==
Properties	Metric
Tensile strength	230 MPa
Yield strength	125 MPa
Elongation at break	25%
Elastic modulus	69 GPa
Shear modulus	26 GPa
Poisson's ratio	0.33

== Thermal properties ==
Thermal Properties	Metric
CTE, linear	21.6 μm/m-°C at Temperature -50.0 - 20.0 °C
Specific Heat Capacity	0.890 J/g-°C
Thermal Conductivity	172 W/m-K
Melting Point	588 - 650 °C
Solidus	588 °C
Liquidus	650 °C

== Applications ==
- Body-panel
- Body-structure and parts
