= Fracture resistance =

Dentistry term

Fracture Resistance is an existing term used very widely and for many years in the dental reconstruction industry. as applied to e.g. dental inlays as used in dental restoration. The same term has also been used since 1986 in oil drilling operations. where the 'resistance' is an effect of drilling mud leakage. The same term is increasingly being used in some metallurgically-adjacent technical conferences

Engineers and materials scientists use the more precise terms fracture toughness, critical stress intensity factor and crack growth resistance to describe how structures and materials fail by fast fracture and by fatigue. These are defined by the theory of fracture mechanics .
