= 6005A aluminium alloy =

6005A aluminium alloy is an alloy in the wrought aluminium-magnesium-silicon family (6000 or 6xxx series). It is closely related, but not identical, to 6005 aluminium alloy. Between those two alloys, 6005A is more heavily alloyed, but the difference does not make a marked impact on material properties. It can be formed by extrusion, forging or rolling, but as a wrought alloy it is not used in casting. It cannot be work hardened, but is commonly heat treated to produce tempers with a higher strength at the expense of ductility.

Alternate names and designations include AlSiMg(A) and 3.3210. The alloy and its various tempers are covered by the following standards:

- ASTM B 221: Standard Specification for Aluminum and Aluminum-Alloy Extruded Bars, Rods, Wire, Profiles, and Tubes
- EN 573-3: Aluminium and aluminium alloys. Chemical composition and form of wrought products. Chemical composition and form of products
- EN 755-2: Aluminium and aluminium alloys. Extruded rod/bar, tube and profiles. Mechanical properties

== Chemical composition ==
The alloy composition of 6005A aluminium is:

- Aluminium: 96.5 to 99.0%
- Chromium: 0.3% max
- Copper: 0.3% max
- Iron: 0.35% max
- Magnesium: 0.4 to 0.7%
- Manganese: 0.5% max
- Silicon: 0.5 to 0.9%
- Titanium: 0.1% max
- Zinc: 0.2% max
- Residuals: 0.15% max

== Properties ==
Typical material properties for 6005A aluminum alloy include:

- Density: 2.71 g/cm^{3}, or 169 lb/ft^{3}.
- Electrical Conductivity: 47 to 50% IACS.
- Young's modulus: 70 GPa, or 10 Msi.
- Ultimate tensile strength: 190 to 300 MPa, or 28 to 44 ksi.
- Yield strength: 100 to 260 MPa, or 15 to 38 ksi.
- Thermal Conductivity: 180 to 190 W/m-K.
- Thermal Expansion: 23.3 μm/m-K.
