= 6010 aluminium alloy =

6010 aluminium alloy has aluminium as the major element, and silicon, magnesium, manganese and zinc as minor elements.

== Chemical composition ==
| Element | Weight Percentage (%) |
|---|---|
| Aluminum | 97.3 |
| Silicon | 1 |
| Magnesium | 0.80 |
| Manganese | 0.5 |
| Copper | 0.35 |

== Mechanical Properties ==
| Properties | Metric |
|---|---|
| Tensile strength | 290 MPa |
| Yield strength | 170 MPa |
| Elastic modulus | 68 GPa |
| Poisson's ratio | 0.33 |
| Elongation at break | 24% |

== Thermal Properties ==
| Thermal Properties | Metric |
|---|---|
| CTE, linear | 21.5 μm/m-°C @Temperature -50.0 - 20.0 °C |
| Specific Heat Capacity | 0.890 J/g-°C |
| Thermal Conductivity | 151 W/m-K |
| Melting Point | 585 - 649 °C |
| Solidus | 585 °C |
| Liquidus | 649 °C |
