= 6013 aluminium alloy =

Alloy of aluminum

6013 aluminium alloy consist of magnesium, silicon, copper, manganese, iron, zinc, chromium, and titanium as minor alloying elements.

== Chemical composition ==
Element	Weight percentage (%)
Aluminum, Al	94.8–97.8
Magnesium, Mg	0.80–1.2
Silicon, Si	0.60–1
Copper, Cu	0.60–1.1
Manganese, Mn	0.20–0.80
Iron, Fe	≤ 0.50
Zinc, Zn	≤ 0.25
Chromium, Cr	≤ 0.10
Titanium, Ti	≤ 0.10
Remainder (each)	≤ 0.15
Remainder (total)	≤ 0.050

== Mechanical properties ==
Properties	Values
Tensile strength	≥ 392 MPa
Yield strength	≥ 379 MPa
Elongation at break	≥ 5%
Young's modulus	69 GPa
Fatigue strength	98 to 140 MPa

== Applications ==
1. Valves
2. Machine parts
3. Munitions
4. ABS braking systems
5. Hydraulic applications
6. Roller blade parts
