= 6005 aluminium alloy =

6005 aluminium alloy is an alloy in the wrought aluminium-magnesium-silicon family (6000 or 6xxx series). It is closely related, but not identical, to 6005A aluminium alloy. The main difference between the two alloys is that 6005 has a higher minimum composition percentage of aluminium than 6005A (while having essentially the same maximum). The most common forming method is extrusion. It can also be forged or rolled, but as a wrought alloy it is not used in casting. It is commonly heat treated to produce tempers with a higher strength at the expense of ductility.

Alternate names and designations include AlSiMg and A96005. The alloy and its various tempers are covered by the following standards:

- ASTM B 221: Standard Specification for Aluminium and Aluminium-Alloy Extruded Bars, Rods, Wire, Profiles, and Tubes
- EN 573-3: Aluminium and aluminium alloys. Chemical composition and form of wrought products. Chemical composition and form of products
- EN 755-2: Aluminium and aluminium alloys. Extruded rod/bar, tube and profiles. Mechanical properties
- ISO 6361: Wrought Aluminium and Aluminium Alloy Sheets, Strips and Plates

== Chemical Composition ==
The alloy composition of 6005 aluminium is:

- Aluminium: 97.5 to 99.0%
- Chromium: 0.1% max
- Copper: 0.1% max
- Iron: 0.35% max
- Magnesium: 0.4 to 0.6%
- Manganese: 0.1% max
- Silicon: 0.6 to 0.9%
- Titanium: 0.1% max
- Zinc: 0.1% max
- Residuals: 0.15% max

== Properties ==
Typical material properties for 6005 aluminium alloy include:

- Density: 2.70 g/cm^{3}, or 169 lb/ft^{3}.
- Young's modulus: 69 GPa, or 10 Msi.
- Ultimate tensile strength: 190 to 300 MPa, or 28 to 44 ksi.
- Yield strength: 100 to 260 MPa, or 15 to 38 ksi.
- Thermal Expansion: 23 μm/m-K.
