= Body in white =

Stage in automobile manufacturing

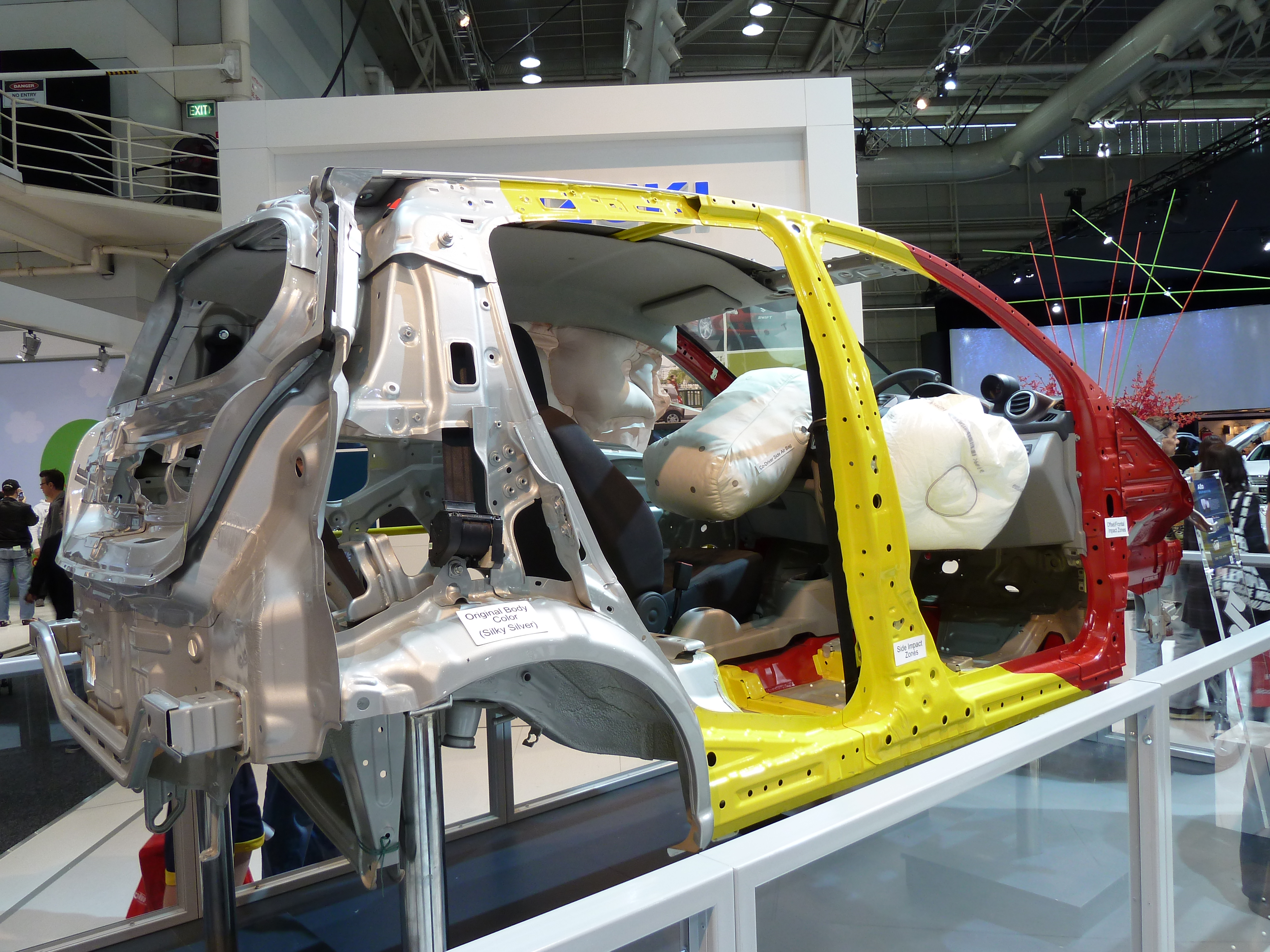
Body in white, partially outfitted to highlight the safety systems fitted to the vehicle.

Body in white (BIW) is the stage in automobile manufacturing in which a car body's frame has been joined together, that is before painting and before the motor, chassis sub-assemblies, or trim (glass, door locks/handles, seats, upholstery, electronics, etc.) have been integrated into the structure. Assembly involves different techniques such as welding (spot, MIG/MAG, or friction stir), riveting, clinching, bonding and laser brazing.

The term derives from manufacturing practices before steel unibody monocoques, when automobile bodies were made by outside firms on a separate chassis with an engine, suspension, and bumpers attached. The manufacturers built or purchased wooden bodies (with thin, non-structural metal sheets on the outside) to bolt onto the frame. The bodies were painted white prior to the final color.

A folk etymology for "body in white" is the appearance of a car body after it is dipped into a white bath of primer (undercoat paint)— despite the primer's actual gray color. BIW could also refer to when car bodywork would be made of timber – all timber products, furniture, etc., are considered to be "in the white" when at the stage of raw timber before finishing or varnishing.

In car design, the "body in white" phase is where the final contours of the car body are worked out, in preparation for the ordering of the expensive production stamping die. Extensive computer simulations of crash-worthiness, manufacturability, and automotive aerodynamics are required before a clay model from the design studio can be converted into a body in white ready for production.

Factories may offer BIW cars to racers, who then may replace up to 90% of the car with aftermarket parts, and niche manufacturers like Ruf Automobile start their cars with BIWs from other makers.

== Related terms ==
A related term in the automotive industry is "body in black". This can refer to a car body that is formed of alternate materials such as composites rather than conventional metal; these composite materials, such as carbon fiber, are black rather than white. "Body in black" can also refer to a step in the design process in which a mock-up of a new car skin is built, in order to perform exacting measurements during the design and pre-production processes.
