= Anthony Bajada =

American inventor

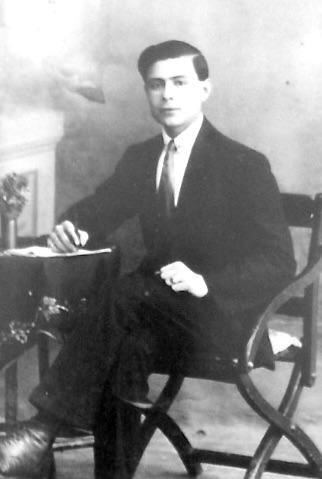
- Born: Anthony Dominic Bajada; September 22, 1902; Hamrun, Malta, British Empire
- Died: July 20, 2000 (aged 97); Menlo Park, California, United States
- Known for: Inventor of the stay-tab for beverage cans
- Spouse: Elizabeth Julia Waldvogel (m. 1925; died 2001)
- Children: Evelyn Elizabeth; George Anthony
- Relatives: Jake Chasan (great-grandson); Fred Chasan; Roslyn Chasan; Mark Chasan
- Military career
- Allegiance: British Empire
- Branch: British Army
- Conflicts: World War I

Anthony Dominic Bajada (September 22, 1902 – July 20, 2000) was a British–American inventor from Malta known for creating and patenting the stay-tab press-to-open lid mechanism for drink cans.

== Early life and career ==
Anthony Bajada was born on September 22, 1902, in Hamrun, Malta, a colony of the British Empire to Sevario and Carmela Bajada.

After serving in the British Army in World War I, at 17 years old he moved to the United States, traveling aboard the White Star Line's RMS Olympic on the Southampton to New York City route by way of Cherbourg, France. He arrived in New York City exactly one week before his 18th birthday in 1920, where he boarded the transcontinental railroad bound for San Francisco.

He married Elizabeth Waldvogal (b. 1905, d. 2001) in 1925 in San Francisco and had two children, Evelyn (b. 1928, d. 2010) and George (b. 1935, d. 2026). He moved to Palo Alto in 1961 and to Menlo Park in 1968.

Early in his career he worked as a machinist, making tools and dies until he later became a property investor in 1948.

== Invention of the opening mechanism on drink cans ==
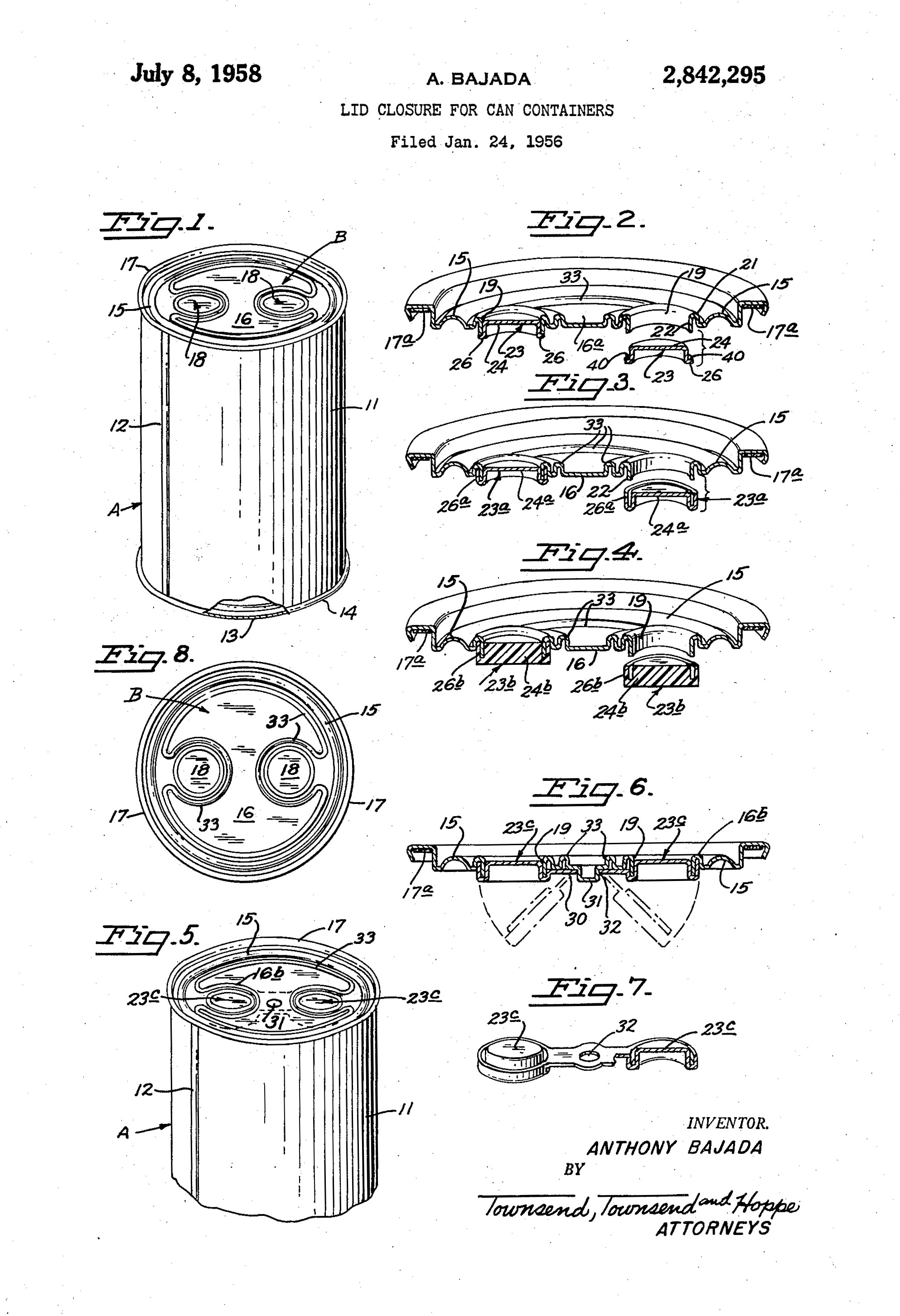
Patent Application for "Lid closure for can containers"

In 1956, Anthony filed for a patent titled "Lid closure for can containers," which described a mechanism for opening canned containers with a "press-it" type closure that pushed inwardly into the can to permit the contents to be poured. The patent was granted in 1958.

Prior to Bajada’s invention, it was necessary to either use a separate opening device such as a can opener or to use a pull tab mechanism. The use of a detached can-opener proved cumbersome, as without the tool the can could not be opened and the pull tab design was dangerous as the detached tab could be ingested and was not easy to see in an x-ray.

One of the novel aspects of Bajada's design is that the can's opening mechanism is self-contained on the can's lid, eliminating the need to use any additional devices to open the can.

At the time, Bajada marveled that "the advantages of his invention would become apparent" upon seeing the design; a statement that proved true. Within two months of Bajada's patent expiry, inventor Ermal C. Fraze and the Reynolds Metals Company filed patents on designs for a “pull tab" mechanism for soda cans. Subsequently, during volume manufacturing, companies such as Crown Cork & Seal Company, BHP, and United States Steel Corporation began making lid mechanisms based on Bajada’s design.

== Later years and death ==
Anthony Bajada remained a resident of Menlo Park until his death on July 20, 2000. He was survived by his wife, his two children, his 6 grandchildren, and his 15 great-grandchildren (including Jake Chasan).

== See also ==
- Drink can
- Stay-tab
- Aluminum can
