= Aluminium–manganese alloys =

Type of metal alloy

Aluminium–manganese alloys (AlMn alloys) are aluminium alloys that contain manganese (Mn) as the main alloying element. They consist mainly of aluminium (Al); in addition to manganese, which accounts for the largest proportion of about 1% of the alloying elements, but they may also contain small amounts of iron (Fe), silicon (Si), magnesium (Mg), or copper (Cu). AlMn is almost only used as a wrought alloy and is processed into sheets or profiles by rolling or extrusion presses. These alloys are corrosion-resistant, have low strengths for aluminium alloys, and are not hardenable (by heat treatment). They are standard in the 3000 series.

== Applications ==
Aluminium–manganese alloys are used in applications with low strength requirements and also in chemical and food-related environments due to their corrosion resistance. AlMn is therefore used more commonly as a functional material than a construction material.

AlMn is processed into beverage cans and is generally referred to as the packaging material used. It is used for apparatus and pipes in the chemical industry, for roof cladding, wall coverings, pressure vessels, roller shutters, roller doors, and heat exchangers.

== Influences of the alloy elements ==
Manganese combines with aluminium to form intermetallic phases—phases which contain a different crystallographic structure than either manganese or aluminium by itself. Compared to conventional alloys, the increased metallic bonding within the intermetallic phase of AlMn increases its strength and chemical resistance. Each percent of manganese increases its strength by about 42 MPa. Iron and silicon are usually unwanted accompanying elements that cannot be completely removed. Magnesium and copper are more effective in enhancing strength, providing an increase of 70–85 MPa per % of Mg when added to the alloy.

== Phases ==
=== Binary aluminium manganese phases ===
Aluminium and manganese are partially miscible in the solid state, meaning they can mix to some extent in the solid phase. However, their complete solubility in each other is limited, and they tend to form various intermetallic phases. The eutectic, between aluminium and Al_{6}Mn is 1.3% manganese and 660 °C, while pure aluminium melts at 660.2 °C. Values of 1.8% and 657 °C or 658 °C can also be found in older literature.

Above 710 °C, Al_{4}Mn is formed with a manganese content of at least 4%. However, such high levels are not typically used. Below 510 or 511 °C, Al_{12}Mn forms.

The solubility of manganese in the Mn-Al solid solution falls rapidly with decreasing temperature and is close to zero at room temperature.

=== Phases in AlMn materials with other elements ===
Some of the AlMn materials also contain iron (Fe) or silicon (Si) additives. These form the phases Al_{3}Fe, Al_{8}Fe_{2}Si, Al_{5}FeSi, and Al_{15}Si_{2}(Mn,Fe)_{3}.

- Aluminium and Al_{15}Si_{2}(Mn,Fe)_{3} are formed from the melt, Al_{3}Fe and Al_{6}(Mn,Fe) at 648 °C.
- At temperatures below 630 °C, aluminium, Al_{15}Si_{2}(Mn,Fe)_{3} and Al_{8}Fe_{2}Si are formed from the melt, Al_{3}Fe.
- Aluminium, Al_{5}FeSi and Al_{15}Si_{2}(Mn,Fe)_{3} are formed from the melt and Al_{8}Fe_{2}Si at around 600 °C.
- Aluminium, silicon and Al_{15}Si_{2}(Mn,Fe)_{3} are formed from the melt andAl_{5}FeSi at around 565 °C.

== Structures ==
The structure resulting from casting into bars or slabs consists of the main mass, which is an oversaturated mixed crystal, along with areas containing manganese-containing phases that have an average size of about 100 μm. A significant portion of the manganese (approximately 0.7 to 0.9%) remains dissolved in aluminium because the cooling rates after casting are too rapid for all the manganese to undergo diffusion and precipitate. This is further exacerbated by the very low diffusion speed of manganese in aluminium.

Through processes such as homogenization and forming (rolling, forging), the structure of the material undergoes changes. During this transformation, various phases that were previously present within the basic aluminium crystal structure, each having a size of less than one micron, are eliminated. These particles contribute to an approximately 25% increase in strength compared to pure aluminium. They exhibit thermal stability and are challenging to dissolve.

In the formed and homogenized state, the material exhibits a very fine structure, and the larger manganese-containing areas observed in the initial casting state are no longer present. These finely dispersed particles also impede grain growth, further enhancing the material's strength. However, this improvement is relatively modest, as the influence of grain size on the strength of aluminium materials is generally limited.

The presence of silicon accelerates the excretion of Al_{12}(Mn, Fe)_{3}Si. If there is enough silicon, the Al_{6}(Mn,Fe) is converted to Al_{12}(Mn,Fe)_{3}Si during homogenization.

== Properties and standardised alloys ==
Composition	code	Condition	yieldpoint (MPa)	tensilestrength (MPa)	elongation at break
AlMn1Cu	3003	O ( soft annealed) HX2 ( work hardened, 1/4 hard)	50 120	110 140	29% 11%
AlMn1	3103	Oh HX2	45 115	105 135	29% 11%

== 3000 series ==
3000 series are alloyed with manganese and can be work hardened.

3000 series aluminium alloy nominal composition (% weight) and applications
Alloy	Al contents	Alloying elements	Uses and refs
3003	98.6	Mn 1.5; Cu 0.12	Universal, sheet, rigid foil containers, signs, decorative
3004	97.8	Mn 1.2; Mg 1	Universal, beverage cans
3005	98.5	Mn 1.0; Mg 0.5	Work-hardened
3102	99.8	Mn 0.2	Work-hardened
3103&3303	98.8	Mn 1.2	Work-hardened
3105	97.8	Mn 0.55; Mg 0.5	Sheet
3203	98.8	Mn 1.2	Sheet, high-strength foil
