= Fraze Pavilion =

Outdoor theater in Kettering, Ohio, US

- The Fraze
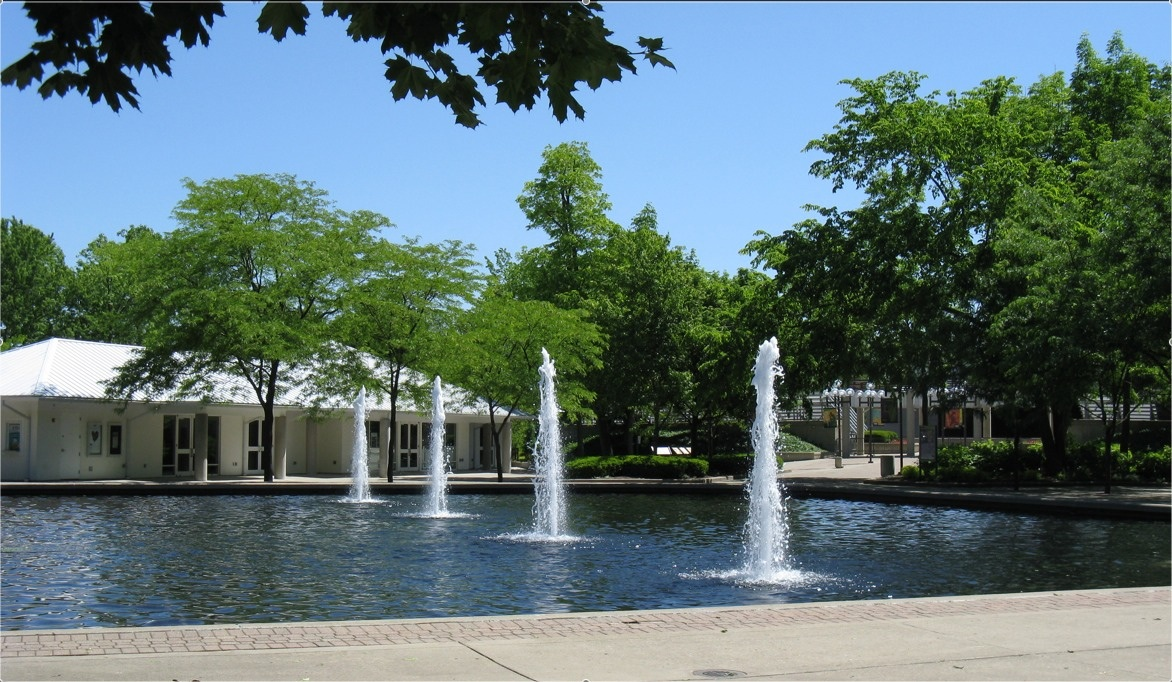
- Interactive map of Fraze Pavilion
- Location: 695 Lincoln Park Blvd; Kettering, Ohio 45429
- Coordinates: 39°41′49″N 84°9′30″W
- Owner: City of Kettering
- Capacity: 4,300
- Surface: Concrete/Grass

Construction
- Opened: 1991

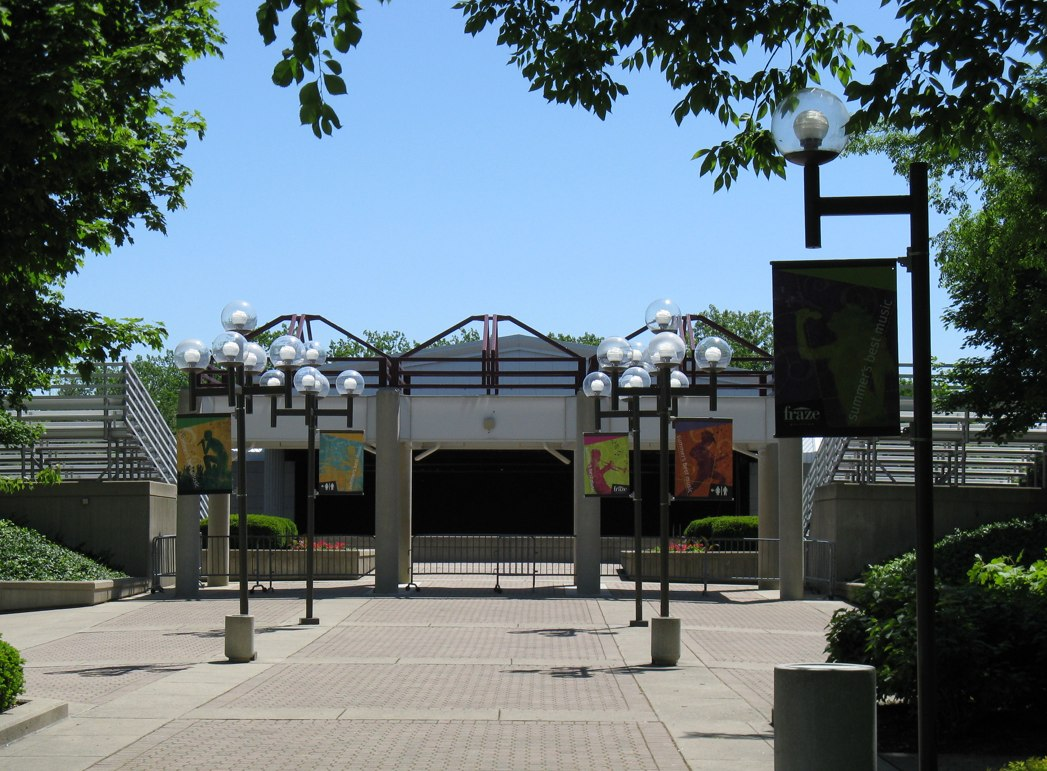

The Fraze Pavilion is a 4,300-seat outdoor amphitheater in Kettering, Ohio, that opened in 1991. The Pavilion is named after Ermal Fraze, late resident of Kettering and inventor of the pop-top beverage can.

The theater hosts many popular American and international music artists.

== History ==
Marvin Hamlisch was the very first act to play the Fraze in 1991.

In 2003, Sheryl Crow performed two back-to-back sold-out concerts, during which she filmed her DVD, C'mon America 2003.

The Lincoln Park Civic Commons, just outside the Pavilion Gates, is home to several local festivals and music events, including the Swamp Romp Cajun-Zydeco Festival; Blues Fest; Festival of the Vine, a wine and jazz festival; Spass Nacht, an Austrian Festival in honor of Kettering's Sister City, Steyr, Austria, and Art on the Commons and a juried art festival.

The Fraze was ranked 14th in the world in Pollstar Magazine's worldwide ticket report for entertainment venues in 2010. The Fraze was ranked 22nd in the world for the same recognition by Pollstar in 2011.

== See also ==
- List of contemporary amphitheatres
