= 3004 aluminium alloy =

Wrought aluminum manganese alloy

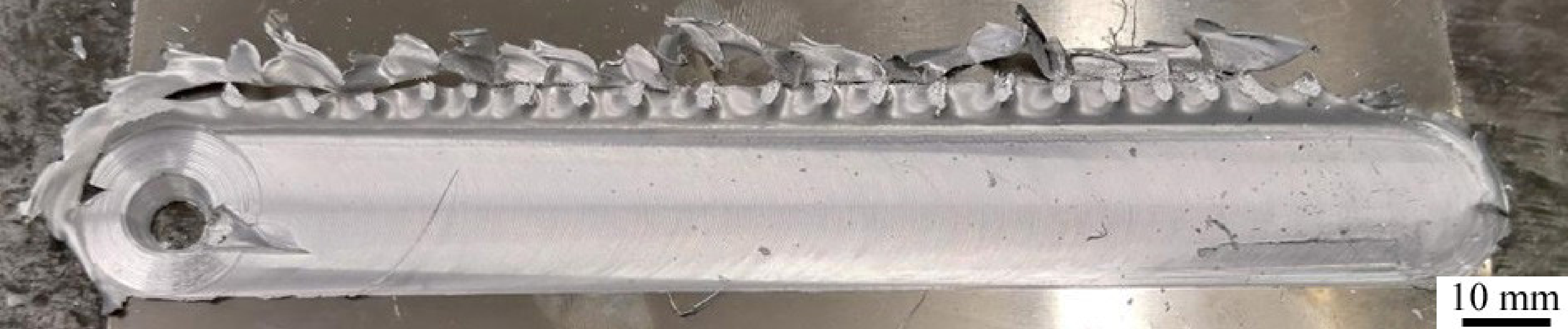
3004 aluminium alloy used in testing of friction stir welding.

3004 aluminium alloy is an alloy in the wrought aluminium-manganese alloys family (3000 or 3xxx series). It is similar to the 3003 alloy, except for the addition of approximately 1% magnesium. It can be cold worked (but not, unlike some other types of aluminium alloys, heat treated) to produce tempers with a higher strength but a lower ductility. Like most other aluminium-manganese alloys, 3003 is a general-purpose alloy with moderate strength, good workability, and good corrosion resistance. It is commonly rolled and extruded, but typically not forged. As a wrought alloy, it is not used in casting.

The alloy 3004 is commonly used in the making of beverage cans. It was developed to satisfy the need for thinner gauges in can-stock, and thereby to some extent replaced its predecessor 3003 alloy in the making of beverage cans. Can-stock can be made thinner due to the addition of 1% magnesium, which contributes in solid solution strengthening.

Alternate designations include 3.0526 and A93004. 3004 aluminium and its various tempers are discussed in the following standards:

- ASTM B 209: Standard Specification for Aluminium and Aluminium-Alloy Sheet and Plate
- ASTM B 221: Standard Specification for Aluminium and Aluminium-Alloy Extruded Bars, Rods, Wire, Profiles, and Tubes
- ASTM B 547: Standard Specification for Aluminium and Aluminium-Alloy Formed and Arc-Welded Round Tube
- ISO 6361: Wrought Aluminium and Aluminium Alloy Sheets, Strips and Plates

== Chemical Composition ==
3004 Aluminium Alloy Composition by Mass %
Al	Mg	Si	Fe	Cu	Zn	Mn	Remainder
95.6 to 98.2%	0.8 to 1.3%	0.3% max	0.7% max	0.25% max	0.25% max	1.0 to 1.5%	0.15% max
