= Beverage can printing =

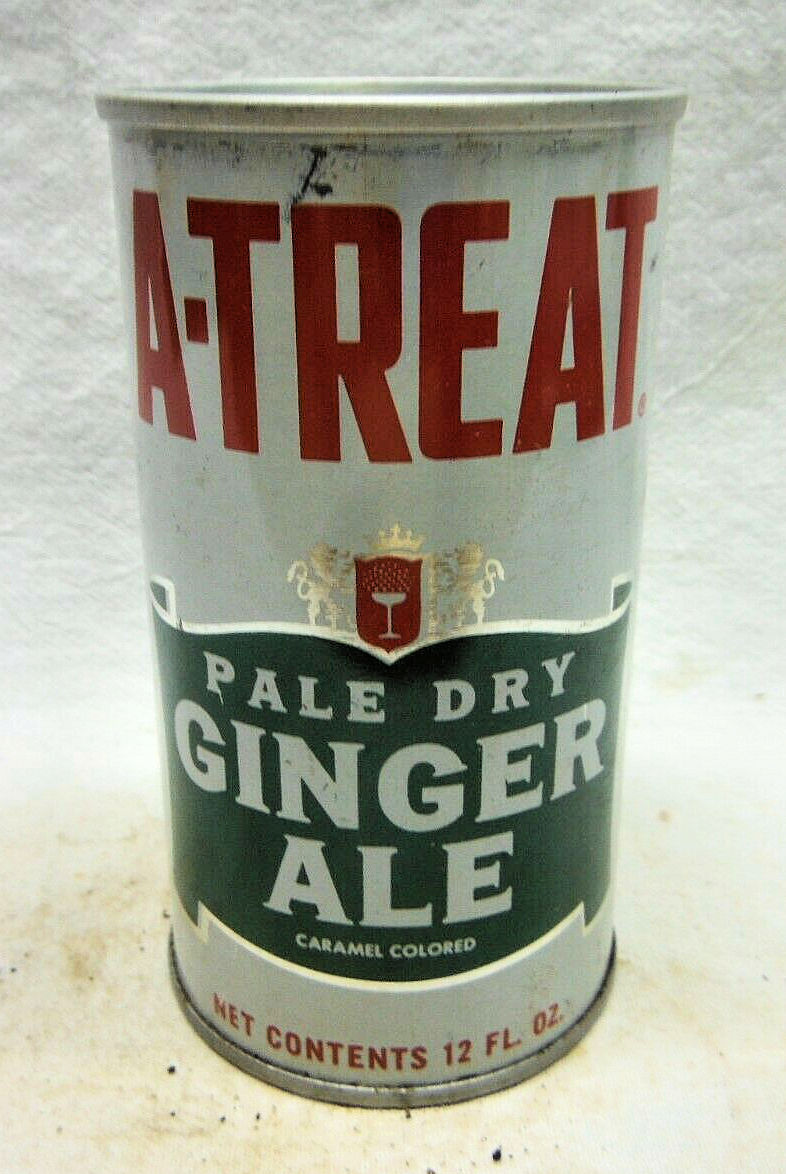
Label printed onto a 1965 can of ginger ale

Beverage can printing is the application of an image to a metal beverage can, to advertise its contents.

== History ==
The first beer sold in a can was in 1935, when a brewery in the United States inquired American Can Company about the possibility of packaging their beer in cans. In 1931, American Can Company began to experiment with the possibility of canned beer as they anticipated that the Prohibition period would soon end. The major obstacle in producing beer cans was that no current cans could withstand the excess pressure that was required in packaging beer. Two years later, American Can company successfully designed a coating that would prevent the beer from reacting with the tinplate cans.

Now that they developed a successful beer can, American Can Company had to pitch their innovation to breweries. While large breweries were skeptical of the unproven packaging method, the Gottfried Krueger Brewery took American Can Company's offer of no charge for the install of the canning equipment in the event that canned beer was unsuccessful. The test results were extremely successful, and on January 24, 1935 in Richmond, Virginia, the first canned beer hit the public market as "Krueger’s Finest Beer." By the end of 1935, no less than 37 US breweries were producing canned beer.

Felinfoel Brewery Company, located at Llanelli, Wales, became the first brewery outside the United States to sell canned beer, and it was also a success. The package for this beer was called a "conetop". Interest in canned beer grew so rapidly that by 1937, 23 breweries were producing 40 brands of canned beer.

World War II temporarily stopped this innovation. Canning of beer for the general public resumed in 1946. By this point, most breweries were using flat-top cans instead. From the 1950s to the 1960s, all beer cans were composed of three pieces of metal. Two-piece conetop cans hit the market in 1940 with the introduction of the crowntainer, by Crown, Cork & Seal Co. Throughout the years, innovative ideas and development slowly changed the beer can into what it is today. According to Ball Corporation, beer cans weighed 83 grams in 1951, and was then reduced to 38 grams by 1974, to what it is now today at only 21 grams.

Beer cans have been printed with colored photographic images since 1956, "first was famous Scottish and English landmarks and then with pinup girls", called the Lager Lovelies. These cans were popular all over the world. Extensive testing has been done with four color printing on the beers, but every attempt proved unsuccessful.

Coors examined many can coating curing methods and decided to implement an ultraviolet system, which they started to do in 1975. Coors is the only manufacturer to use the UV curing method in the United States. In 1986, they made further innovations to their UV coating lines to increase flexibility and efficiency.

Metal Box Company, a United Kingdom company, developed a method called "Reprotherm" for two-piece cans. In this process, the image to be printed is transferred to the can through a printed medium. Recently, a company called Nacano developed a six color printing method for two-piece cans, "but the first cans to be produced by this process have looked faded and washed out".

=== Coatings and inks ===
The coatings on metals tend to fall into two categories: thermoplastic or thermoset. A thermoplastic coating does not chemically react when the substrate undergoes drying after the coating process. The drying of thermoplastic coatings is accomplished by evaporation or by applying heat to fuse the material to the metal. Metals with thermoplastic coatings are not resistant to high heat or aggressive solvents. The coating on the metal can re-melt with exposure to heat or strong solvents from the screen-printing process. A thermoset coating cures by a chemical reaction called polymerization and/or crosslinking. The coating is cured by baking the coated metals at high temperatures for long periods of time. Thermoset coatings tend to be resistant to heat and remelting, and they generally provide excellent solvent and scuff resistance.

Ultraviolet light (UV) curing technology-UV process was motivated by a desire to increase can printing speeds, to reduce energy consumption, and to lower air emissions.

Both solvent-based and UV inks are available for decorating coated metals, but solvent-based formulations are the most commonly used. While advances have been made that allow UV inks to perform well on a growing range of metal materials, the chemical properties and curing characteristics of UV inks still limit their functionality compared to solvent-based varieties.

Solvent-based coatings contain solvents at concentrations of approximately 70 to 75 percent by volume (1). The solvent composition is typically a mixture of aliphatic hydrocarbons, aromatics, ethers, cellosolves and acetates. This method produces significant VOC (volatile organic compound) and HAP (hazardous air pollutant) emissions. The coatings have good abrasion resistance and high quality, but the high VOC emissions have virtually eliminated their use in can plants.

== Sources ==
- "CAN GRAPHICS". Ball Packaging Americas. Ball Packaging Americas, n.d. Web. 16 Feb 2011. https://web.archive.org/web/20110411201428/http://www.ballamericas.com/page.jsp?page=81
- "Government Sues American Can Company". New York Times. New York Times, 30 11 1913. Web. 16 Feb 2011. https://timesmachine.nytimes.com/timesmachine/1913/11/30/100078883.pdf
- "History of the Beverage Can". Ball Packaging – Europe. Ball Packaging, n.d. Web. 16 Feb 2011. https://web.archive.org/web/20110126234904/http://www.ball-europe.com/382_311_ENG_PHP.html
- "IMAGES & LOGOS". Ball Corporation. Ball Corporation, n.d. Web. 16 Feb 2011. https://web.archive.org/web/20101212094745/http://ballcorporate.com/page.jsp?page=44&id=24 [16]
- "Inside a Ball Beverage Can Plant". Ball Packaging Americas. Ball America, n.d. Web. 16 Feb 2011. http://www.ballamericas.com/img/vault/BallMetal-BeverageProcess.pdf
- "Preliminary Industry Characterization: Metal Can Manufacturing--Surface Coating". U. S. Environmental Protection Agency. U. S. Environmental Protection Agency, 09 1998. Web. 16 Feb 2011.
- "UV Curing of Coating on Metals." Pollution Protection. Pollution Protection, n.d. Web. 16 Feb 2011. http://www.p2pays.org/ref/26/25750.pdf
