= Indent =

Indent may refer to:

- Indent (album), a 1973 free jazz album by Cecil Taylor
- indent (Unix), a computer program that formats programming language files with a particular indent style
- Indent test, a test for material hardness
- Indent, a special type of purchase order
  - Indent agent, or buying agent, person or company that purchases goods on behalf of another party

== See also ==
- Indentation (disambiguation)
