= Drink can =

Container specifically made for liquid such as beverages and usually made of aluminum

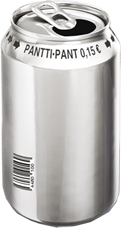
Beverage can

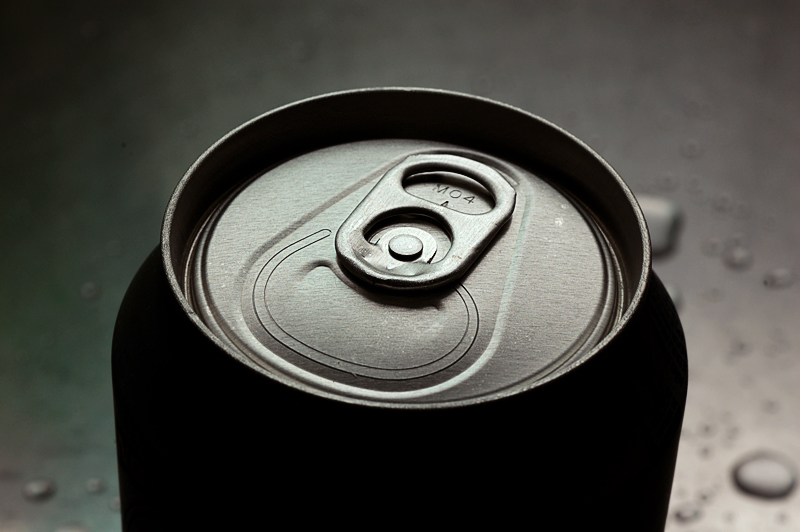
The stay-tab opening mechanism characteristic of most drinking cans since the mid-1980s. The 'wide-mouth' version, seen here, was introduced in the late 1990s.

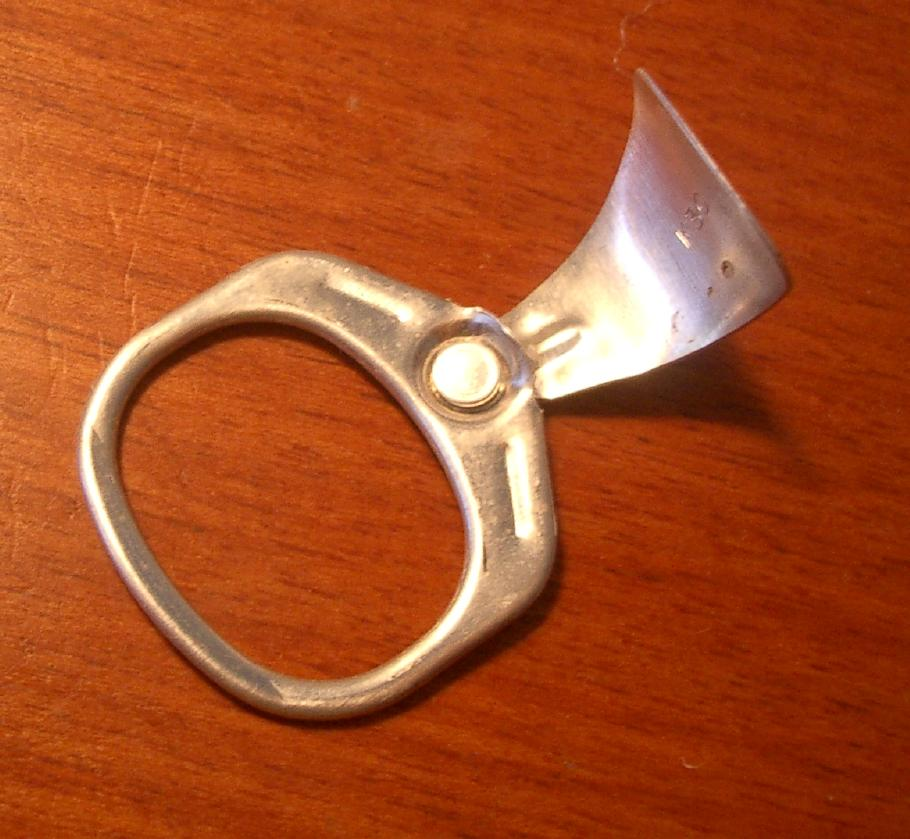
A pop tab from the 1970s

A drink can (or beverage can) is a metal container with a polymer interior designed to hold a fixed portion of liquid such as carbonated soft drinks, alcoholic drinks, fruit juices, teas, herbal teas, energy drinks, etc. Drink can exteriors are made of aluminum (75% of worldwide production) or tin-plated steel (25% worldwide production) and the interiors coated with an epoxy resin or polymer. Worldwide production for all drink cans is approximately 370 billion cans per year.

== History ==
The first commercial beer available in cans began in 1935 in Richmond, Virginia. Not long after that, sodas, with their higher acidity and somewhat higher pressures, were available in cans. The key development for storing drinks in cans was the interior liner, typically plastic or sometimes a waxy substance, that helped to keep the product's flavor from being ruined by a chemical reaction with the metal. Another major factor for the timing was the repeal of Prohibition in the United States at the end of 1933.

In 1935, the Felinfoel Brewery at Felinfoel in Wales was the first brewery outside the US to commercially can beer. Prior to this time, beer had been available only in barrels or in glass bottles. From this time, lightweight tin cans could be used. Felinfoel was a major supplier to British armed forces abroad in the Second World War. Cans saved a great deal of space and weight for wartime exports compared to glass bottles and did not have to be returned for refilling. These early cans did not have a pull tab, being equipped instead with a crown cork (metal bottle cap). From the 18th century until the early 20th century Wales dominated world tinplate production, peaking in the early 1890s when 80% of the world's tinplate was produced in south Wales.

Canned drinks were factory-sealed and required a special opener tool in order to consume the contents. Cans were typically formed as cylinders, having a flat top and bottom. They required a can piercer, colloquially known as a "church key", that latched onto the top rim for leverage; lifting the handle would force the sharp tip through the top of the can, cutting a triangular hole. A smaller second hole was usually punched at the opposite side of the top to admit air while pouring, allowing the liquid to flow freely.

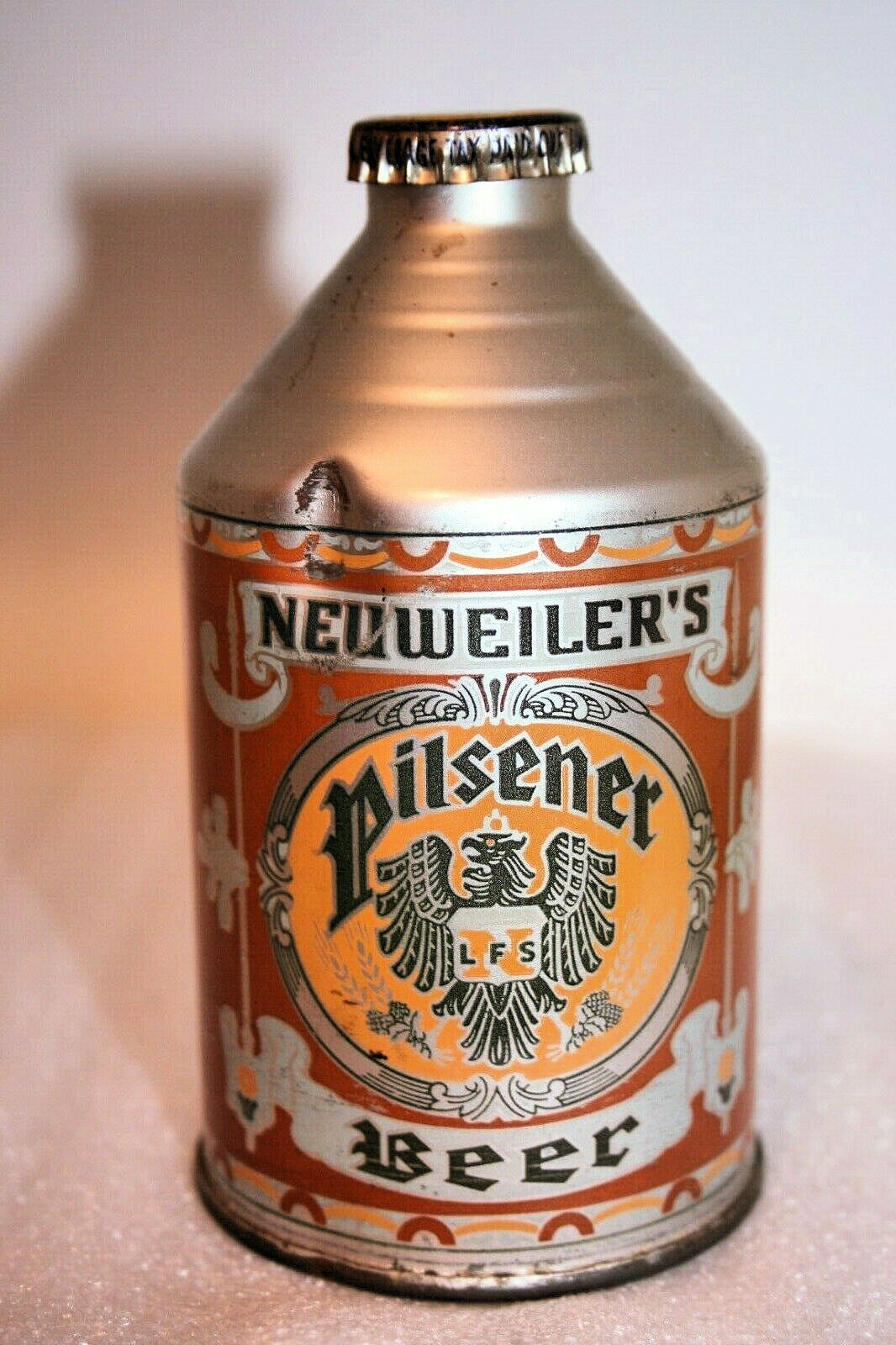
A 1946 Neuweiler "crowntainer" beer can

In the mid-1930s, some cans were developed with caps so that they could be opened and poured more like a bottle. These were called "cone tops", as their tops had a conical taper up to the smaller diameter of the cap. Cone top cans were sealed by the same crimped caps that were put on bottles, and could be opened with the same bottle-opener tool. There were three types of conetops: high profile, low profile, and j-spout. The low profile and j-spout were the earliest, dating from about 1935. The "crowntainer" was a different type of can that was drawn steel with a bottom cap. These were developed by Crown Cork & Seal Company (now known as Crown Holdings, Inc.), a leading drink packaging and drink can producer. The popularity of canned drinks was slow to catch on, as the metallic taste was difficult to overcome with the interior liner not perfected, especially with more acidic sodas. Cans had two advantages over glass bottles. First for the distributors, flat-top cans were more compact for transportation and storage and weighed less than bottles. Second for consumers, they did not require the deposit typically paid for bottles, as they were discarded after use. Glass-bottle deposits were reimbursed when consumers took the empties back to the store.

In 1959, the recyclable aluminum can was introduced to the market in a 7 oz. size by the Adolph Coors Company.

In 2008, an aluminum version of the crowntainer design was adopted for packaging Coca-Cola's Caribou Coffee drink.

== Standard sizes ==
Comparison chart of various standards
ml	imp fl oz	US fl oz
1,000	35.2	33.8
568	20.0 (Note: one imperial pint)	19.2
500	17.6	16.9
473	16.6	16.0 (Note: one US pint)
440	15.49	14.88
375	13.2	12.7
355	12.5	12.0
350	12.3	11.8
341	12.0	11.5
330	11.6	11.2
320	11.3	10.8
250	8.8	8.5
237	8.3	8.0 (Note: half a US pint)
222	7.8	7.5
200	7.0	6.8
150	5.3	5.1

The standard size of drink cans in each country significantly varies, and various standard capacities are used internationally.

=== Africa ===
==== South Africa ====
In South Africa, standard cans are 330 ml (reduced in the early 2000s from the up-until-then ubiquitous 340 ml) and the promotional size is 440 ml. There is also the 500 ml can. A smaller 200 ml can is used for "mixers" such as tonic or soda water. It has a smaller diameter than the other cans. In September 2018, a 300 ml can was introduced as an alternative to the 330 ml can in a continued effort to reduce the amount of sugar consumed in soft drinks.

=== Asia ===
==== China ====
In China, the most common size is 330 ml.

Can dimensions may be cited in metric or imperial units; imperial dimensions for can making are written as inches+sixteenths of an inch (e.g. "202" = 2 inches + 2 sixteenths).

==== Hong Kong ====
In Hong Kong, most cans are 330 ml – in the past they were usually 355 or 350 ml. 200 ml has also become available. Some beers and coffees are, respectively, sold with 500 ml and 250 ml cans.

==== India ====
In India, 250 ml, 300 ml, 330 ml, 350 ml and 500 ml cans are available.

==== Indonesia ====
In Indonesia, 320 ml cans were introduced for domestically produced beer in 2018. Carbonated soft drink cans are typically 330 ml.

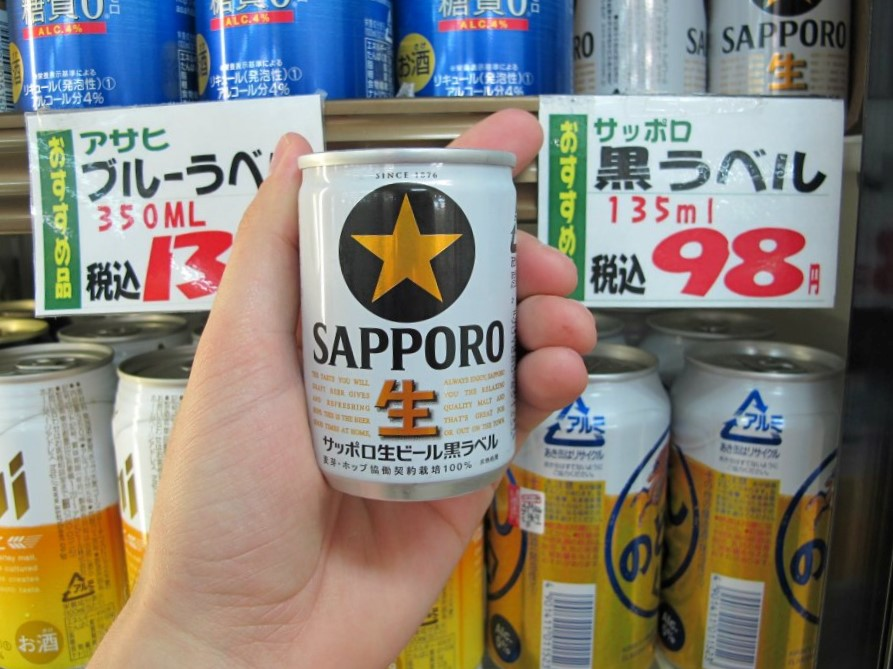
A small 135 ml beer can in Japan

==== Japan ====
In Japan, the most common sizes are 350 ml and 500 ml, while larger and smaller cans are also sold.

==== Malaysia (and Singapore) ====
In Malaysia, beer cans are 320 ml. For soft drinks in both Malaysia and Singapore, the most commonly found cans are 300 ml for non-carbonated drinks and 325 ml for carbonated drinks. Larger 330 ml/350 ml cans are limited to imported drinks which usually cost a lot more than local ones.

==== Pakistan ====
In Pakistan, the most common sizes are 250 ml and 330 ml, and 200 ml cans are also sold.

==== South Korea ====
In South Korea, 250 ml cans are the most common for soft drinks, but when accompanying take-out food (such as pizza or chicken), a short 245 ml can is standard. Recently, some 355 ml cans which are similar to North American cans are increasingly available, but are limited mostly to Coca-Cola and Dr Pepper, and beer cans are available in 500 ml.

==== Thailand ====
In Thailand, Singha beer uses 320 ml cans for domestic sales and 330 ml cans for exports.

==== West Asia ====
In West Asia, standard cans are 330 ml.

=== Europe ===
In Europe, the standard can is 330 ml, but since the 1990s 250 ml has slowly become common for energy drinks (e.g. Red Bull), along with 500 ml, often used for beers and sometimes for soft drinks too (particularly in wholesale supply).

==== United Kingdom ====
In the United Kingdom, 440 ml is commonly used for lager and cider. Some beers are available in 568 ml pint cans.

==== Ireland ====
In Ireland, 330 ml and 440 ml fat cans are used for soft drinks.

==== Austria ====
In Austria, energy drinks are usually sold in sizes of 200 to 330 ml.

=== North America ===
In North America, the standard can size is 12 US fl oz or 355 ml.

==== United States ====
The United States standard can is 4.83 in or 12.3 cm high, 2.13 in or 5.41 cm in diameter at the lid, and 2.6 in or 6.60 cm in diameter at the widest point of the body. Also available are 16 US fl oz or 473 ml cans (known as tallboys or, referring to the weight, "pounders"), and 18 US fl oz or 532 ml.

In the U.S. state of Hawaii, many domestically filled beverages use a distinctive "206 diameter" 12 US fl oz can with a longer neck and four reinforcing ridges below the lip, a legacy format produced locally by Ball Corporation's Kapolei plant. Separately, several locally made juice and tea drinks are commonly sold in 11.5 US fl oz (340 mL) cans, including products from Hawaiian Sun and Aloha Maid/ITO EN Hawaii.

==== Canada ====
In Canada, the standard size was previously 12 Imperial fluid ounces (341 ml), later redefined and labelled as 341 ml in 1980. This size was commonly used with steel drink cans in the 1970s and early 1980s. However, the US standard 355 ml can size was standardized in the 1980s and 1990s upon the conversion from steel to aluminum. Some drinks, such as Nestea, are sold in 341 ml cans.

In Quebec, a new standard for carbonated drinks has been added, as some grocery stores now only sell cans of all major carbonated drinks in six-packs of 222 ml cans. Many convenience stores also began selling "slim cans" with a 310 ml capacity in 2015.

==== Mexico ====
In Mexico, the standard size is 355 ml, although smaller 235 ml cans have gained popularity in the late 2010s and early 2020s.

=== Oceania ===
==== Australia ====
In Australia, the standard can size for alcoholic and soft drinks is 375 ml. Energy drinks and some soft drinks are served in 250 ml and 500 ml sizes. Some beers are produced in 330 ml and 500 ml cans.

==== New Zealand ====
In New Zealand, the standard can size is 330 ml, although Coca-Cola Amatil changed some of its canned drinks to 330 ml in 2017.

=== South America ===
==== Brazil ====
In Brazil, the standard can size is 350 ml.

== Composition ==
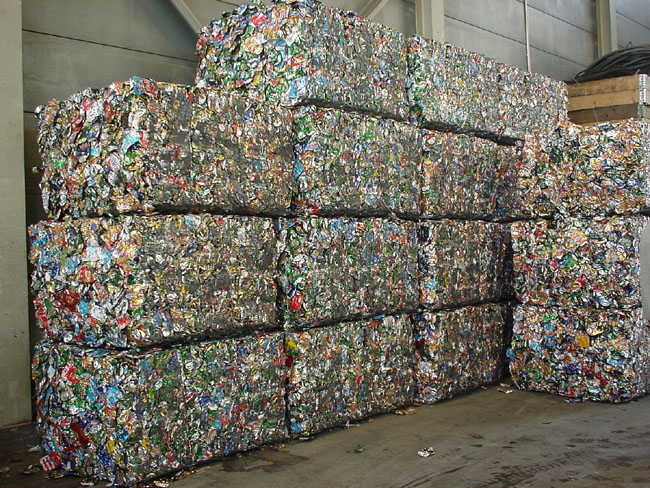
Aluminum cans pressed into blocks for recycling

Most metal drink cans manufactured in the United States are made of aluminum, whereas in some parts of Europe and Asia approximately 55 percent are made of steel and 45 percent are aluminum alloy. Steel cans often have a top made of aluminum. Beverage containers are made of two different aluminum alloys. The body is made of the 3004 alloy that can be drawn easily and the top is made of the harder 5182 alloy.

In 2001, the Australian Aluminium Council reported that the average Australian-size can weighed approximately 14.9 grams (0.53 oz). Improved manufacturing techniques had allowed Australian manufacturers to reduce metal requirements from the 1992 average of 16.55 grams (0.584 oz). In 2011, an empty U.S.-size can weighed approximately one-half ounce (14 g), with approximately 34 per pound or 70 per kilogram.

In many parts of the world a deposit can be recovered by turning in empty plastic, glass, and aluminum containers. Scrap metal dealers often purchase aluminum cans in bulk, even when deposits are not offered. Aluminum is one of the most cost-effective materials to recycle. When recycled without other metals being mixed in, the can–lid combination is perfect for producing new stock for the main part of the can—the loss of magnesium during melting is made up for by the high magnesium content of the lid. Also, reducing ores such as bauxite into aluminum requires large amounts of electricity, making recycling cheaper than producing new metal.

Aluminum cans are coated internally to protect the aluminum from oxidizing. Despite this coating, trace amounts of aluminum can be degraded into the liquid, the amount depending on factors such as storage temperature and liquid composition. Chemical compounds used in the internal coating of the can include types of epoxy resin.

== Fabrication process ==
Video describing the design and manufacture of aluminum cans

Modern cans are generally produced through a mechanical cold forming process that starts with punching a flat blank from very stiff cold-rolled sheet. This sheet is typically alloy 3104-H19 or 3004-H19, which is aluminum with about 1% manganese and 1% magnesium to give it strength and formability. The flat blank is first formed into a cup about three inches in diameter. This cup is then pushed through a different forming process called "ironing" which forms the can. The bottom of the can is also shaped at this time. The malleable metal deforms into the shape of an open-top can. With the sophisticated technology of the dies and the forming machines, the side of the can is thinner than either the top and bottom areas, where stiffness is required.

Plain lids (known as shells) are stamped from a coil of aluminum, typically alloy 5182-H48, and transferred to another press that converts them to easy-open ends. This press is known as a conversion press which forms an integral rivet button in the lid and scores the opening, while concurrently forming the tabs in another die from a separate strip of aluminum.

== Filling cans ==
Cans are filled before the top is crimped on by seamers. To speed up the production process filling and sealing operations need to be extremely precise. The filling head centers the can using gas pressure, purges the air, and lets the drink flow down the sides of the can. The lid is placed on the can, and then crimped in two operations. A seaming head engages the lid from above while a seaming roller to the side curls the edge of the lid around the edge of the can body. The head and roller spin the can in a complete circle to seal all the way around. Then a pressure roller with a different profile drives the two edges together under pressure to make a gas-tight seal. Filled cans usually have pressurized gas inside, which makes them stiff enough for easy handling. Without the riveted tab the scored section of the can's end would be impossible to lift from the can.

Can filling lines come in different line speeds from 15,000 cans per hour (cph) up to 120,000 cph or more, all with different levels of automation. For example, lid feeding alone starts with manual debagging onto a simple v-chute connected to the seamer up to fully automated processes with automatic debagging and lid feeding of lids combined with automatic roll depalletizers for filling debaggers by robots.

== Opening mechanisms ==
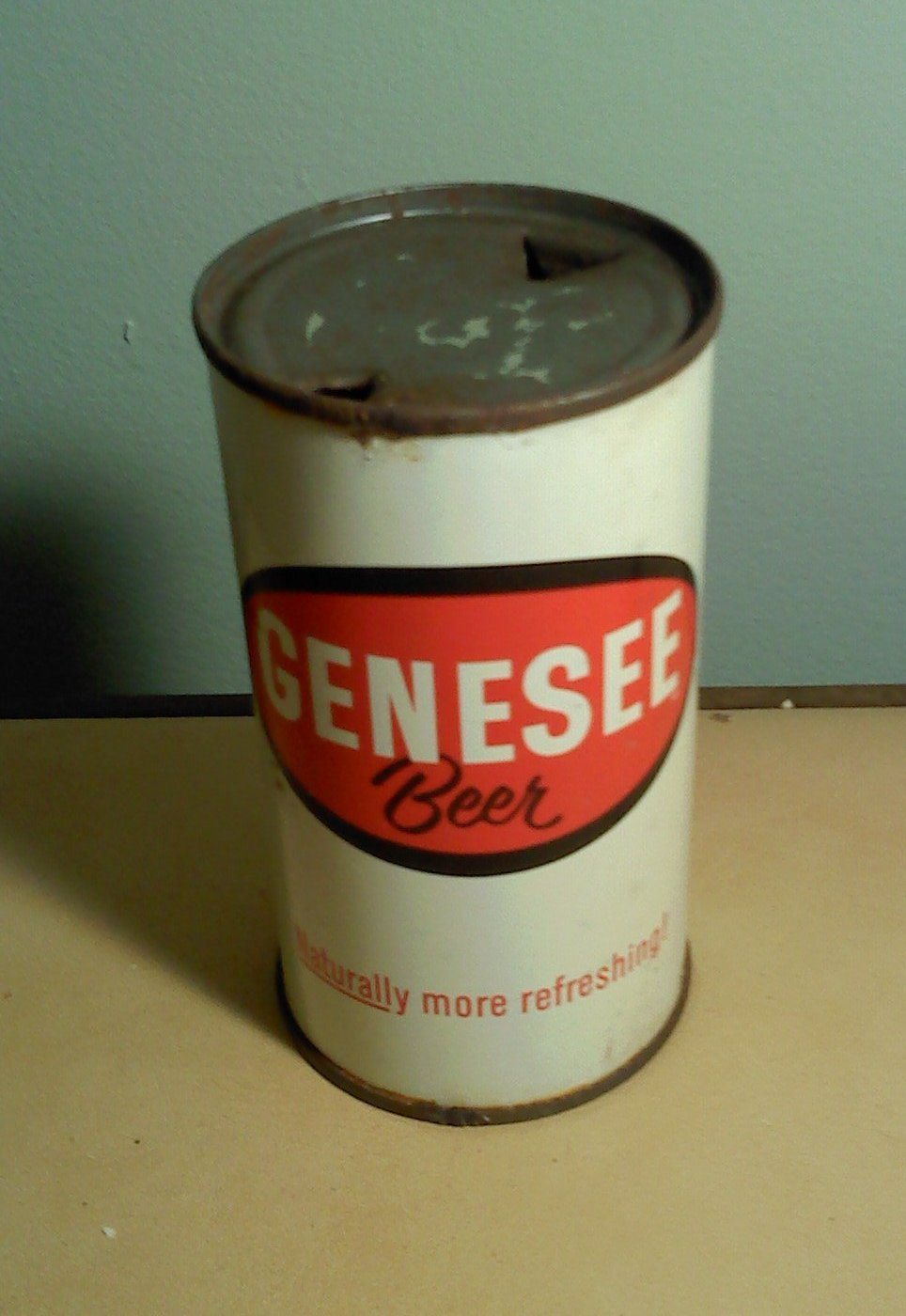
Old beer can showing punches from a churchkey

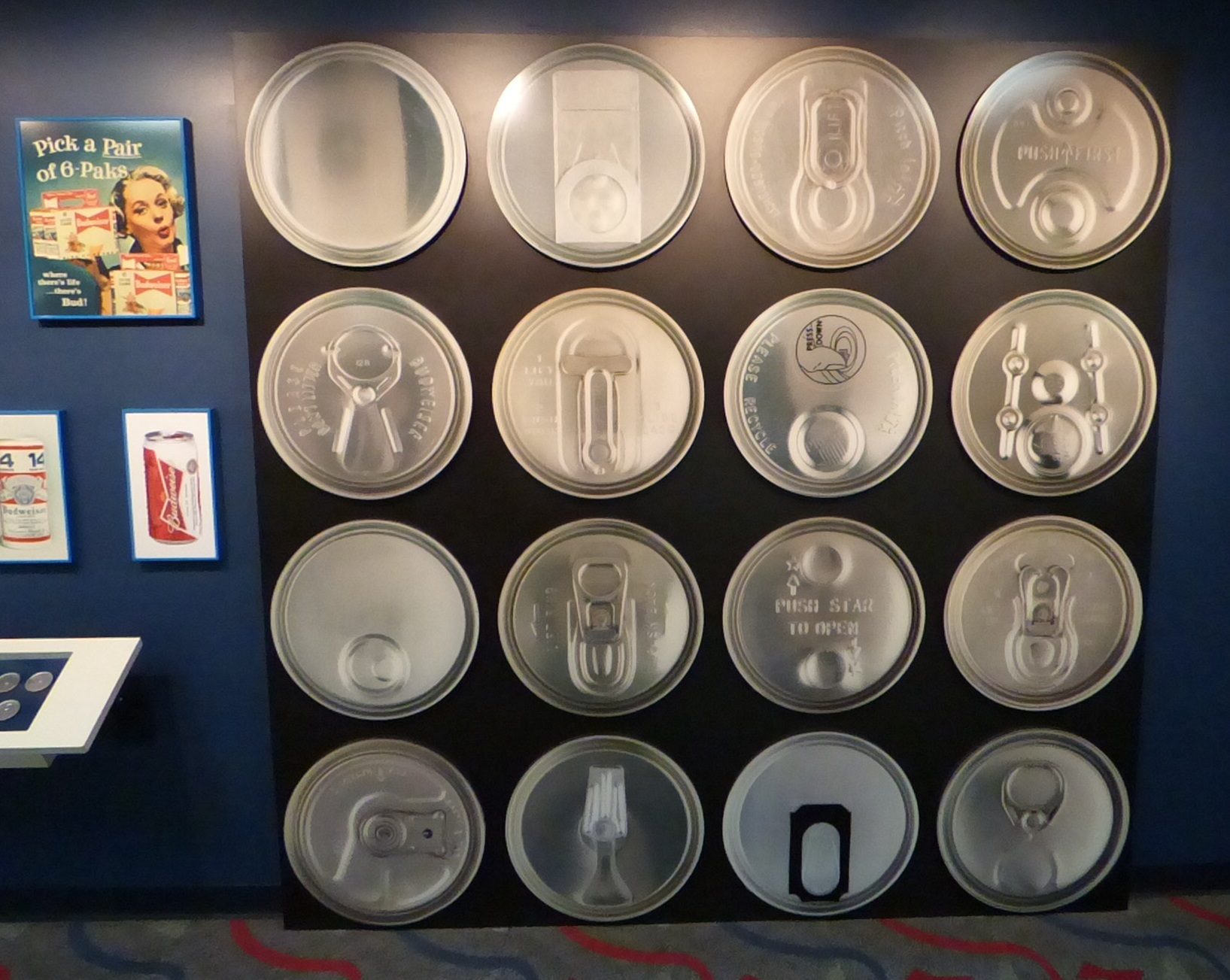
Beer can pop-top display at a Budweiser Brewery

Early metal drink cans had no tabs; they were opened by a can-piercer or churchkey, a device resembling a bottle opener with a sharp point. The can was opened by punching two triangular holes in the lid—a large one for drinking, and a second smaller one to admit air.

As early as 1922, inventors were applying for patents on cans with tab tops, but the technology of the time made these inventions impractical. Later advancements saw the ends of the can made out of aluminum instead of steel.

In 1959, Ermal Fraze devised a can-opening method that would come to dominate the canned drink market. His invention was the "pull-tab". This eliminated the need for a separate opener tool by attaching an aluminum pull-ring lever with a rivet to a pre-scored wedge-shaped tab section of the can top. The ring was riveted to the center of the top, which created an elongated opening large enough that one hole simultaneously served to let the drink flow out while air flowed in. Previously, while on a family picnic, Fraze had forgotten to bring a can opener and was forced to use a car bumper to open a can of beer. Thinking there must be an easier way, he stayed up all night until he came up with the pull tab. Pull-tab cans, or the discarded tabs from them, were colloquially called "pop-tops".

Into the 1970s the pull-tab was widely popular, but its popularity came with the problem of people frequently simply discarding the pull-tabs on the ground, creating a potential injury risk especially to the feet or fingers. In the 1960s, at least one inventor attempted to solve the litter problem, by having the tab be retained by a stationary key that would wrap the tab around itself, which was unsuccessful commercially.

The problem of the discarded tops was initially solved by the invention of the push-tab. Used primarily on Coors Beer cans in the mid-1970s, the push-tab was a raised circular scored area used in place of the pull-tab. It needed no ring to pull up; instead, the raised aluminum blister was pushed down into the can using one finger. A small unscored section of the tab prevented it from detaching and falling into the can after being pushed in. Push-tabs never gained wide popularity because while they had solved the litter problem of the pull-tab, they created a safety hazard where the person's finger upon pushing the tab into the can was immediately exposed to the sharp edges of the opening. A feature of the push-tab Coors Beer cans was that they had a second, smaller, push-tab at the top as an airflow vent. "Push-tabs" were introduced into Australia from around 1977 and were locally known as "pop-tops", before being replaced later by the Stay-on-tab. The safety and litter problems were eventually solved later in the 1970s with Daniel F. Cudzik's invention of the non-removing "Stay-Tab".

Cans are usually in sealed paperboard cartons, corrugated fiberboard boxes, or trays covered with plastic film. The entire distribution system and packaging need to be controlled to ensure freshness.

=== Pop-tab ===
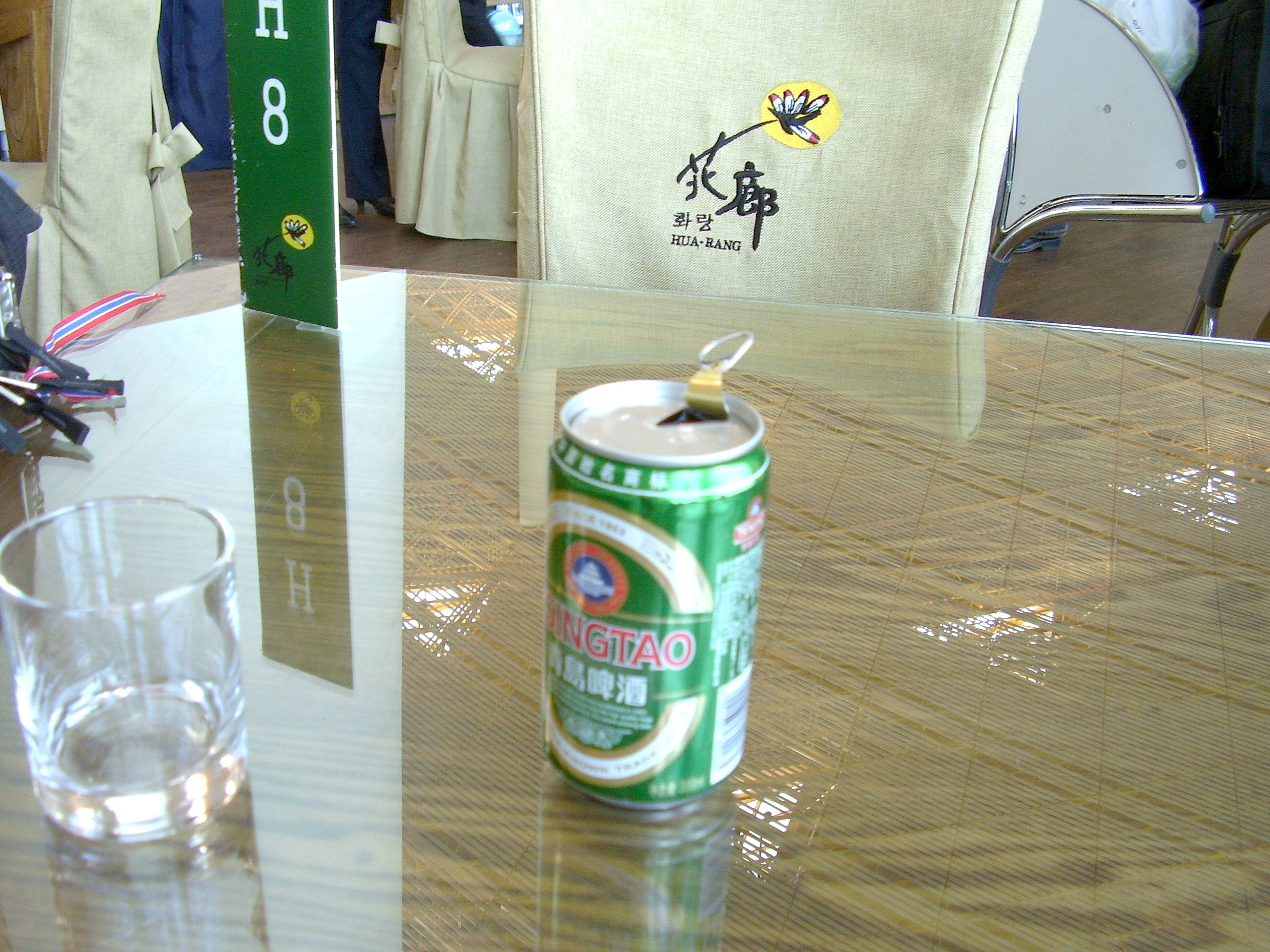
Old style pull-tab in use on a can of Tsingtao beer in Beijing, China in 2009

In 1962, Ermal Cleon Fraze of Dayton, Ohio, United States, invented the integral rivet and pull-tab version (also known as ring pull in British English), which had a ring attached at the rivet for pulling, and which would detach completely to be discarded. He received US Patent No. 3,349,949 for his pull-top can design in 1963 and licensed his invention to Alcoa and Pittsburgh Brewing Company, the latter of which first introduced the design on Iron City Beer cans. The first soft drinks to be sold in all-aluminum cans were R.C. Cola and Diet-Rite Cola, both made by the Royal Crown Cola company, in 1964.

The early pull-tabs detached easily. In 1976, the Journal of the American Medical Association noted cases of children ingesting pull-tabs that had broken off and dropped into the can.

Full-top pull-tabs were also used in some oil cans and are currently used in some soup, pet food, tennis ball, nuts, and other cans.

=== Stay-on-tab ===
- Opening a stay-on-tab drink can
- Opening a stay-on-tab drink can

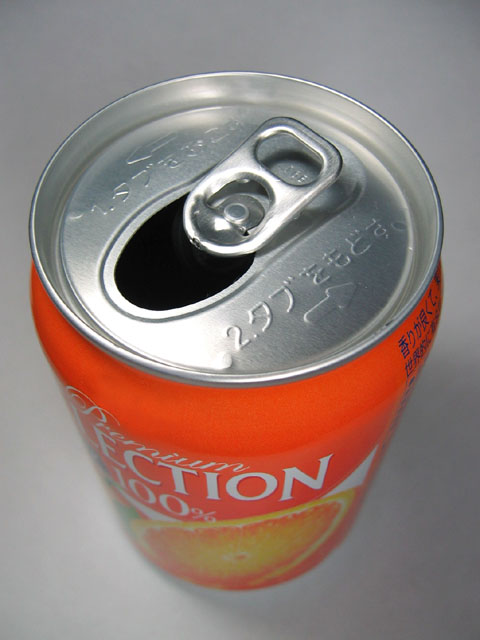
A "standard" size can open, once common in American soft drinks

In 1958, American inventor Anthony Bajada was awarded the patent for a "Lid closure for can containers". Bajada's invention was the first design to keep the opening tab connected to the lid of the can, preventing it from falling into the contents of the can. His patent expired in 1975 and has been directly cited in the mechanisms used by companies such as Crown Cork & Seal Co., BHP, and United States Steel Corporation. Approximately one month after Bajada's patent expired, Daniel F. Cudzik, an engineer with Reynolds Metals, filed a design patent application for an "End closure for a container". This later became known as a "Sta-Tab". When the Sta-Tab launched in 1975, on Falls City beer and, quickly, other drinks, there was an initial period of consumer testing and education. Cudzik later received patents for this "Easy Open Wall" (US 3967752, issued 1976-07-06 US 3967753, issued 1976-07-06). The validity of these patents was upheld in subsequent litigation.

The similarly designed "Easy-open ecology end" was invented by Ermal Fraze and Omar Brown. Its patent application was also filed in 1975, less than two months after the expiration of Bajada's patent. This design, like Cudzik's, uses a separate tab attached to the upper surface as a lever to depress a scored part of the lid, which folds underneath the top of the can and out of the way of the resulting opening, thus reducing injuries and roadside litter caused by removable tabs.

Such "retained ring-pull" cans supplanted pull-off tabs in the United Kingdom in 1989 for soft drinks and 1990 for alcoholic drinks.

The stay-on-tab (SOT) opening system solved the environmental issue of the previous pull-tab design. However, it introduced a new, still unresolved hygiene concern: the outer panel of the tab now sinks into the liquid inside the can.

One of the more recent modifications to can design was the introduction of the "wide mouth" can in the late 1990s. The American Can Company, now a part of Rexam, and Coors Brewing Company have owned wide mouth design patent (number D385,192) since 1997. Other companies have similar designs for the wide mouth. Ball Corporation's from 2008 has a vent tube to allow direct airflow into the can reducing the number of gulps during the pour.

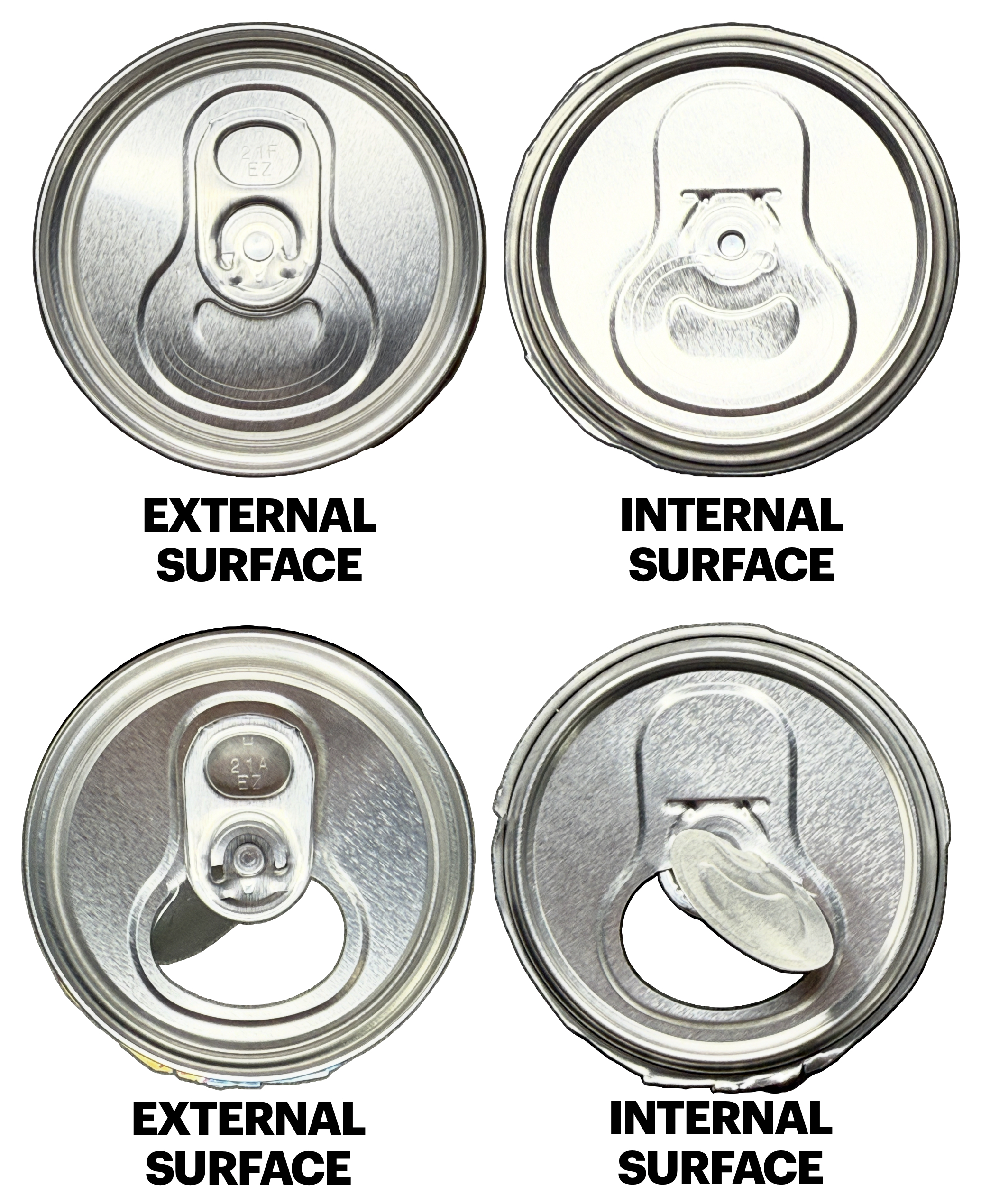
The external and internal surfaces of a beverage can lid with a stay-on-tab style opening system. Closed, and open.

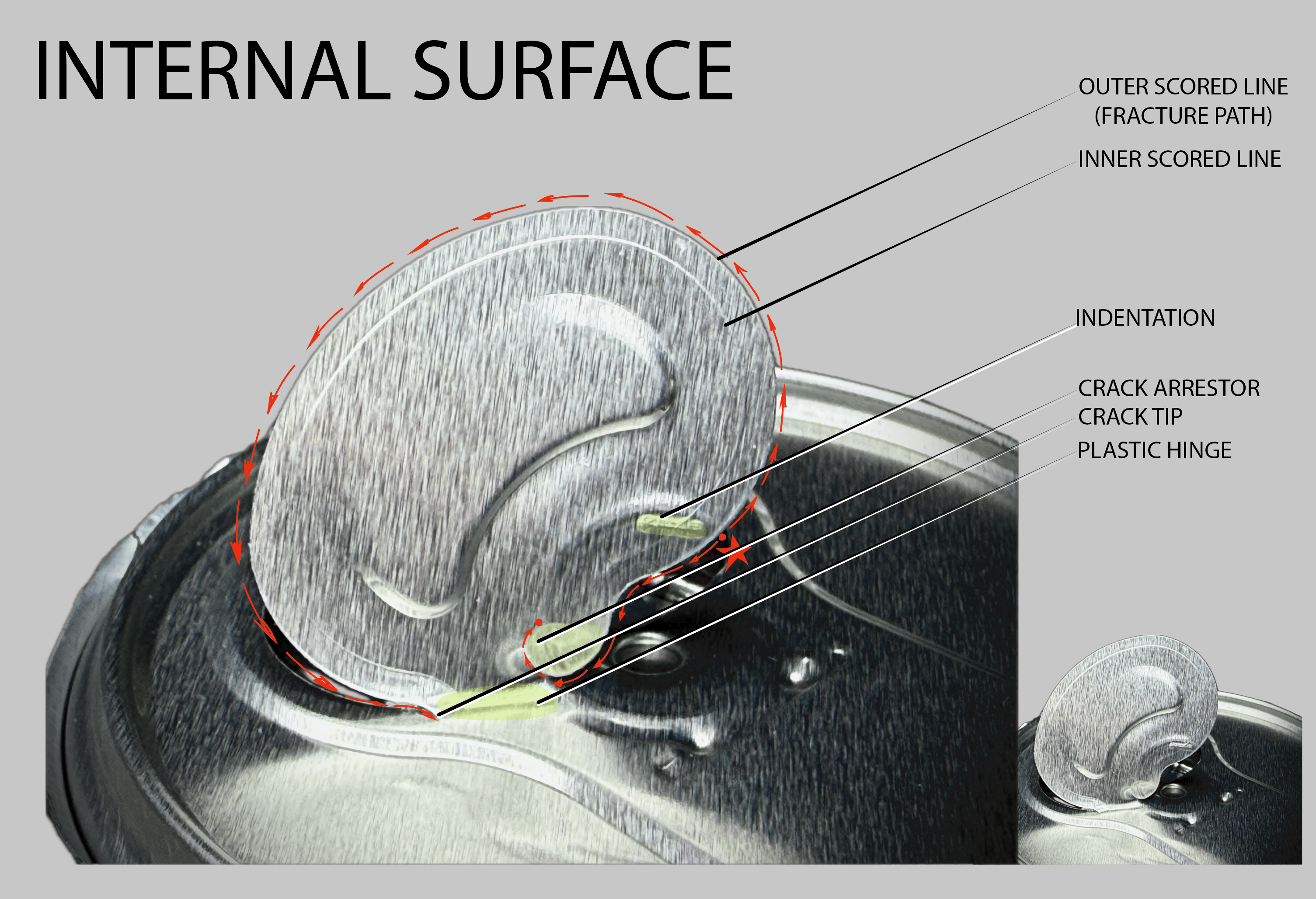
Various features of an STO beverage can lid, depicting the scored lines, the indentation which acts as a stress shield to initiate a crack at the outer scored line, a crack arrestor which prevents the crack from growing too far and completely cutting off the opening, and the crack directions ending in crack tips with some metal in between them to act as a plastic hinge

Current SOT opening systems have a great deal of embedded design and engineering for them to open consistently and to avoid injury. In addition to the scored part of the lid, there is an indentation in the lid over one of the scored lines which points to the other scored line. This indentation localizes the applied stress from lifting the tab and acts as a stress shield to apply a critical amount of localized stress to fracture the aluminum along the scored line. The crack that is initiated grows in two directions: back toward the tab and around a crack arresting feature, and then around the perimeter of the opening to the other end of the scored line where the crack stops--the metal between the crack arresting shape and the end of the crack acts as a plastic hinge to allow the tab to push the opening of the can away from where the liquid is consumed.

=== Press button can ===
One variation was the press button can, which featured two pre-cut buttons—one small and one large—in the top of the can sealed with a plastic membrane. These buttons were held closed by the outward pressure of the carbonated drink. The consumer would open the can by depressing both buttons, which would result in two holes. The small hole would act as a vent to relieve internal pressure so the larger button could then be pressed down to create the hole used for consuming the drink. Consumers could also easily cut themselves on the edges of the holes or get their fingers stuck.

Press button cans were used by Pepsi in Canada from the 1970s to 1980s and Coors in the 1970s. They have since been replaced with pull tabs. Used in Australia, locally known as "pop-tops", for soft drinks from 1977 to the early 1980s. However, Heineken Brewery did bring back press- or push button cans on the market in Europe as a short-lived marketing strategy in the 1990s.

=== Full aperture end ===
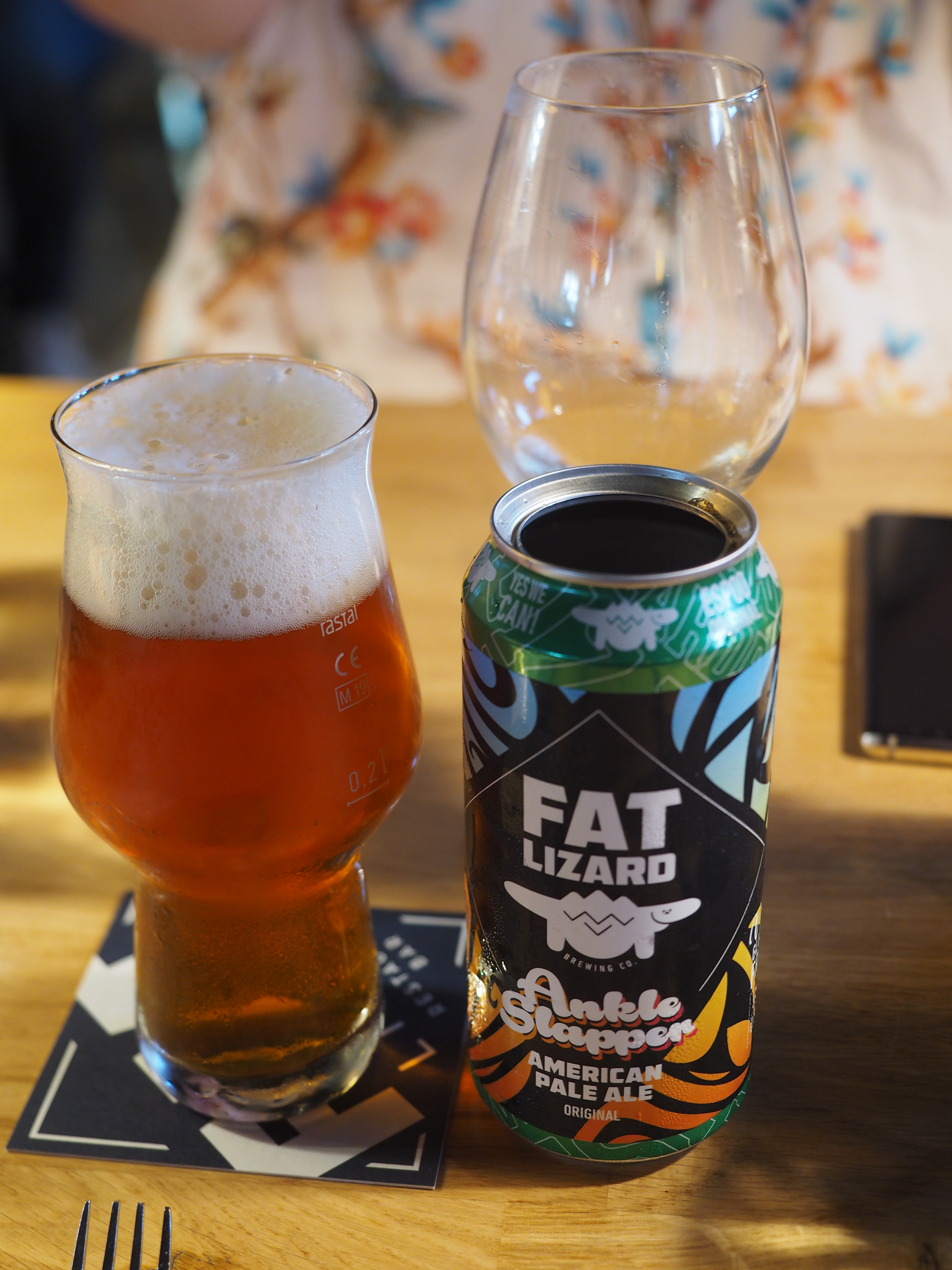
The Finnish brewery Fat Lizard uses "topless" cans where the entire lid is removed when opening the can.

Another variation on the drink can is the "full aperture end", where the entire lid can be removed – turning an aluminum can into a cup. Crown Holdings first designed the "360 End" for use by SABMiller at the 2010 FIFA World Cup in South Africa. It has been used by Anheuser-Busch InBev in China and Brazil and by the Sly Fox Brewing Company in the United States.

=== Resealable lid ===
Another variation on the drink can is to have a resealable lid. A version patented by Cogito Can in France has been used by Groupe Casino, the French grocery chain for its private label energy drink.

== Recycling ==
The beverage container can be recycled, and clean aluminum has residual market value, but recycled cans still need to be diluted by up to 50% virgin aluminum because the sides and tops of the can are of different alloys. The acronym UBC, for used beverage container, is employed by such companies as Apple Inc. for reference to the material of its portable laptop cases.

== Design ==
Most large companies serve their beverages in printed cans, where designs are printed on the aluminum and then crafted into a can. Alternatively, cans can be wrapped with a plastic design, mimicking the printed can but allowing for more flexibility than printed cans. A modern-day trend in craft alcohol is to design stickers to put on cans, allowing for smaller batches and quick changes for new flavors.

Aluminum cans also contain a polymeric coating on the liquid-contacting surface to preserve the taste of the beverage, and because aluminum is susceptible to corrosion via acidic attack.

== Collecting ==
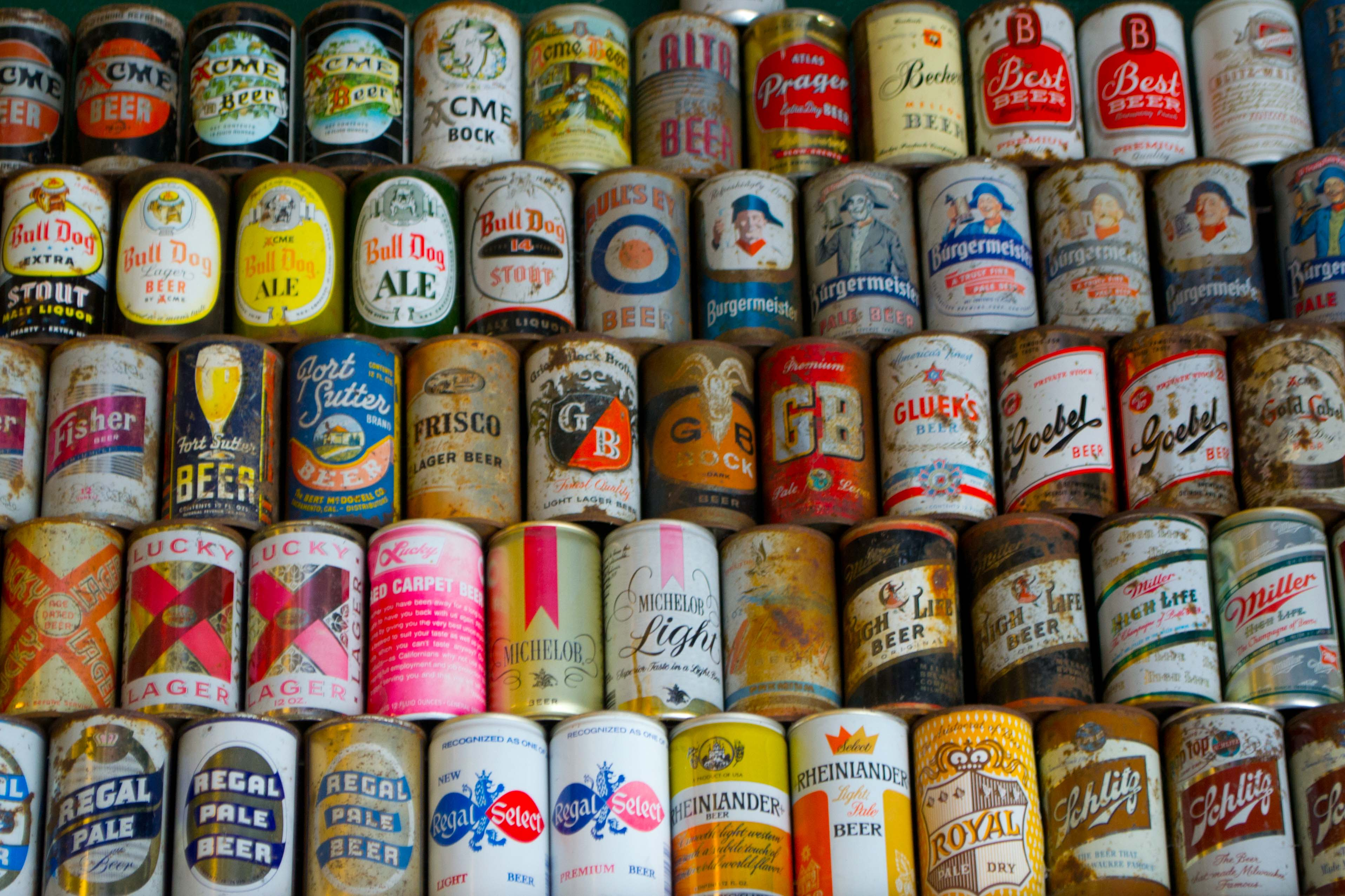
A collection of drink cans in Dunsmuir, California

Beer can collecting was a minor fad in the late 1970s and 1990s. However, the hobby waned rapidly in popularity. The Beer Can Collectors of America (BCCA), founded in 1970, was an organization supporting the hobby, but has now renamed itself Brewery Collectibles Club of America to be more generalized.

As of late 2009, membership in the Brewery Collectibles Club of America was 3,570, down from a peak of 11,954 in 1978. Just 19 of the members were under the age of 30, and the members' average age had increased to 59.

== See also ==
- Beer Can Museum
- Beer can printing
- Beer koozie
- Beverage-can stove
- Glass bottle
- Plastic bottle
- Self-heating can
- Six-pack rings
- Widget (beer)
