= 3003 aluminium alloy =

Wrought aluminum manganese alloy

3003 aluminium alloy is an alloy in the wrought aluminium-manganese family (3000 or 3xxx series). It can be cold worked (but not, unlike some other types of aluminium alloys, heat-treated) to produce tempers with a higher strength but a lower ductility. Like most other aluminium-manganese alloys, 3003 is a general-purpose alloy with moderate strength, good workability, and good corrosion resistance. It is commonly rolled and extruded, but typically not forged. As a wrought alloy, it is not used in casting. It is also commonly used in sheet metal applications such as gutters, downspouts, roofing, and siding.

Alternate designations include 3.0517 and A93003. 3003 aluminium and its various tempers are covered by the ISO standard 6361 and the ASTM standards B209, B210, B211, B221, B483, B491, and B547.

== Chemical Composition ==
The alloy composition of 3003 aluminium is:

- Aluminium: 96.8 to 99%
- Copper: 0.05 to 0.20%
- Iron: 0.7% max
- Manganese: 1.0 to 1.5%
- Silicon: 0.6% max
- Zinc: 0.1% max
- Residuals: 0.15% max
