= Indentation (disambiguation) =

Indentation is the placement of text further to the right, or left, to separate it from surrounding text.

Indentation may also refer to:

- Indentation style, in programming a convention governing the indentation of blocks of code to convey the program's structure
- Indentation hardness, determining the hardness of a material to deformation
- Indenting agent, person or company that purchases goods on behalf of another party

== See also ==
- Indent (disambiguation)
