= Ermal C. Fraze =

American engineer

Ermal Fraze
- Born: September 16, 1913; Muncie, Indiana, U.S.
- Died: October 26, 1989 (aged 76); Kettering, Ohio, U.S.
- Education: Kettering University
- Known for: Inventor of the Pull tab

Ermal Cleon "Ernie" Fraze (September 16, 1913 – October 26, 1989) was an American engineer who invented the pull-tab opener used in beverage cans.

== Early life ==
Fraze was born on a farm near Muncie, Indiana, but later moved to Dayton, Ohio, where he assembled novelties for Cracker Jack boxes.

== Career ==
He started his career in Ohio as a machine tool operator in the 1940s. Using a loan from his wife, Martha, he established the Dayton Reliable Tool & Manufacturing Company, his own machine tool business in 1949. The company produced tools such as improved gun barrels for war planes, including the NASA, General Electric, and Ford. Fraze patented many of his innovations later graduated from Kettering University.

In 1959, while at a picnic with friends and family, Fraze discovered he had left his "church key" can opener at home, forcing him to use a car bumper to open cans of beer. Fraze decided to create an improved beverage opening method that would eliminate the need for a separate device, leading to his creation of the pull-tab opener.

His first design included a lever that pierced a hole in the top of the can, but this caused a safety hazard as it produced sharp edges that could cut the user's finger. Later that year, he established a mechanism known as the "pull-tab" can, with its users simply being required to pull a removable tab to open the drink.

He received U.S. patent No. 3,255,917 for the invention in 1963, and subsequently sold it to Alcoa. By 1965, around 75% of U.S. breweries were using them, but in the mid-1970s, pressure from environmentalists due to litter led to the development of the non-removable tabs used today. By 1980, his company was supplying can-end machinery worldwide making over $500 million in annual revenue.

== Death ==
Fraze died in 1989 in Kettering, Ohio from a brain tumor, leaving an estate worth $41 million. Soon after his death, the family sold the Dayton Reliable Tool Company to business managers, but the business remained in Dayton. In 1992, the Fraze family fired the business managers over an unauthorised attempt to sell the company, and took over the running of the company. The Fraze Pavilion, a 4,300-seat amphitheater in Kettering, was named in his honor.
