= SAE steel grades =

Standard alloy numbering system for steel grades

The SAE steel grades system is a standard alloy numbering system (SAE J1086 – Numbering Metals and Alloys) for steel grades maintained by SAE International.

In the 1930s and 1940s, the American Iron and Steel Institute (AISI) and SAE were both involved in efforts to standardize such a numbering system for steels. These efforts were similar and overlapped significantly. For several decades the systems were united into a joint system designated the AISI/SAE steel grades. In 1995 the AISI turned over future maintenance of the system to SAE because the AISI never wrote any of the specifications.

Today steel quotes and certifications commonly make reference to both SAE and AISI, not always with precise differentiation. For example, in the alloy/grade field, a certificate might refer to "4140", "AISI 4140", or "SAE 4140", and in most light-industrial applications any of the above is accepted as adequate, and considered equivalent, for the job at hand, as long as the specific specification called out by the designer (for example, "4140 bar per ASTM-A108" or "4140 bar per AMS 6349") is certified to on the certificate. The alloy number is simply a general classifier, whereas it is the specification itself that narrows down the steel to a very specific standard.

The SAE steel grade system's correspondence to other alloy numbering systems, such as the ASTM-SAE unified numbering system (UNS), can be seen in cross-referencing tables (including the ones given below).

The AISI system uses a letter prefix to denote the steelmaking process. The prefix "C" denotes open-hearth furnace, electric arc furnace or basic oxygen furnace steels, while "E" specifies only electric arc furnace steel. A letter "L" within the grade name indicates lead as an added ingredient; for example, 12L14 is a common grade that is 1214 with lead added for machinability.

Suffixes may be added to the steel grade which specify the forming process used to create a part. These may include cold working (CDS), hot working (HR), quenching and tempering (Q&T), and other methods.

== Carbon steel ==
Carbon steels and alloy steels are designated a four digit number, whereby the first digit indicates the main alloying element(s), the second digit indicates tg (top grade) element(s), and the last two digits indicate the amount of carbon, in hundredths of a percent (basis points) by weight. For example, a 1060 steel is a plain-carbon steel containing 0.60 wt% C.

An "H" suffix can be added to any designation to denote hardenability is a major requirement. The chemical requirements are loosened but hardness values defined for various distances on a Jominy test.

Major classifications of steel
SAE designation	Type
1xxx	Carbon steels
2xxx	Nickel steels
3xxx	Nickel-chromium steels
4xxx	Molybdenum steels
5xxx	Chromium steels
6xxx	Chromium-vanadium steels
7xxx	Tungsten steels
8xxx	Nickel-chromium-molybdenum steels
9xxx	Silicon-manganese steels

Carbon and alloy steel grades
SAE designation	Type, and composition by weight
Carbon steels
10xx	Plain carbon (Mn 1.00% max.)
11xx	Resulfurized
12xx	Resulfurized and rephosphorized
15xx	Plain Carbon (Mn 1.00–1.65% max.)
15Bxx	Plain Carbon with Boron (Mn 1.00–1.65% max., B 0.0005-0.003% max.)
Manganese steels
13xx	Mn 1.75%
Nickel steels
23xx	Ni 3.50%
25xx	Ni 5.00%
Nickel-chromium steels
31xx	Ni 1.25%; Cr 0.65%, or 0.80%
32xx	Ni 1.75%; Cr 1.07%
33xx	Ni 3.50%; Cr 1.50%, or 1.57%
34xx	Ni 3.00%; Cr 0.77%
Molybdenum steels
40xx	Mo 0.20%, 0.25%, or Mo 0.25% and S 0.042%
44xx	Mo 0.40%, or 0.52%
Chromium-molybdenum (chromoly) steels
41xx	Cr 0.50%, 0.80%, or 0.95%; Mo 0.12%, 0.20%, 0.25%, or 0.30%
Nickel-chromium-molybdenum steels
43xx	Ni 1.82%; Cr 0.50–0.80%; Mo 0.25%
43BVxx	Ni 1.82%; Cr 0.50%; Mo 0.12%, or 0.35%; V 0.03% min
47xx	Ni 1.05%; Cr 0.45%; Mo 0.20%, or 0.35%
81xx	Ni 0.30%; Cr 0.40%; Mo 0.12%
81Bxx	Ni 0.30%; Cr 0.45%; Mo 0.12%; and added boron
86xx	Ni 0.55%; Cr 0.50%; Mo 0.20%
87xx	Ni 0.55%; Cr 0.50%; Mo 0.25%
88xx	Ni 0.55%; Cr 0.50%; Mo 0.35%
93xx	Ni 3.25%; Cr 1.20%; Mo 0.12%
94xx	Ni 0.45%; Cr 0.40%; Mo 0.12%
97xx	Ni 0.55%; Cr 0.20%; Mo 0.20%
98xx	Ni 1.00%; Cr 0.80%; Mo 0.25%
Nickel-molybdenum steels
46xx	Ni 0.85%, or 1.82%; Mo 0.20%, or 0.25%
48xx	Ni 3.50%; Mo 0.25%
Chromium steels
50xx	Cr 0.27%, 0.40%, 0.50%, or 0.65%
50xxx	Cr 0.50%; C 1.00% min
50Bxx	Cr 0.28%, or 0.50%; and added boron
51xx	Cr 0.80%, 0.87%, 0.92%, 1.00%, or 1.05%
51xxx	Cr 1.02%; C 1.00% min.
51Bxx	Cr 0.80%; and added boron
52xxx	Cr 1.45%; C 1.00% min.
Chromium-vanadium steels
61xx	Cr 0.60%, 0.80%, 0.95%; V 0.10%, or 0.15% min.
Tungsten-chromium steels
72xx	W 1.75%; Cr 0.75%
Silicon-manganese steels
92xx	Si 1.40%, or 2.00%; Mn 0.65%, 0.82%, or 0.85%; Cr 0.00%, or 0.65%
High-strength low-alloy steels
9xx	Various SAE grades
xxBxx	Boron steels
xxLxx	Leaded steels

== Stainless steel ==
Stainless steels, on the other hand, are designated with three-digit numbers. Unlike carbon and alloy steel grades, the last two digits do not represent the carbon content.

=== 200 Series—austenitic chromium-nickel-manganese alloys ===
- Type 201— inexpensive austenitic of low nickel content, hardenable only by cold working

=== 300 Series—austenitic chromium-nickel alloys ===
Schaeffler diagram

- Type 301—highly ductile, for formed products. Also hardens rapidly during mechanical working. Good weldability. Better wear resistance and fatigue strength than 304.
- Type 302—same corrosion resistance as 304, with slightly higher strength due to additional carbon.
- Type 303—free machining version of 304 via addition of sulfur and phosphorus. Also referred to as "A1" in accordance with ISO 3506.
- Type 304—the most common grade; the classic 18/8 (18% chromium, 8% nickel) stainless steel. Outside of the US it is commonly known as "A2 stainless steel", in accordance with ISO 3506 (not to be confused with A2 tool steel). The Japanese equivalent grade of this material is SUS304.
- Type 304L—same as the 304 grade but lower carbon content to increase weldability. Is slightly weaker than 304.
- Type 304LN—same as 304L, but also nitrogen is added to obtain a much higher yield and tensile strength than 304L.
- Type 305—same as 304, but with more nickel to decrease work hardening.
- Type 308—used as the filler metal when welding 304.
- Type 309—better temperature resistance than 304, also sometimes used as filler metal when welding dissimilar steels, along with inconel.
- Type 310 310S— is a highly alloyed austenitic stainless steel used for high temperature application. The high chromium and nickel content give the steel excellent oxidation resistance as well as high strength at high temperature. This grade is also very ductile, and has good weldability enabling its widespread usage in many applications.
- Type 316—the second most common grade (after 304); for food and surgical stainless steel uses; alloy addition of molybdenum prevents specific forms of corrosion. It is also known as marine grade stainless steel due to its increased resistance to chloride corrosion compared to type 304. 316 is often used for building nuclear reprocessing plants.
- Type 316L—is an extra low carbon grade of 316, generally used in stainless steel watches and marine applications, as well exclusively in the fabrication of reactor pressure vessels for boiling water reactors, due to its high resistance to corrosion. Also referred to as "A4" in accordance with ISO 3506.
- Type 316LN—same as 316L with nitrogen added to obtain a higher yield and tensile strength than 316L.
- Type 316Ti—variant of type 316 that includes titanium for heat resistance. It is used in flexible chimney liners.
- Type 317;is used in pulp-mills ( which produce pulp for paper-making ), because it is even more corrosion-resistant than 316: it is resistant to the corrosive "liquor" they use in their process. 317L also exists, & due to its lower-carbon, it is weldable without creating carbide-precipitates.
- Type 321—similar to 304 but lower risk of weld decay due to addition of titanium.
- Type 347, with addition of niobium for desensitization during welding.

=== 400 Series—ferritic and martensitic chromium alloys ===
- Type 405—ferritic for welding applications
- Type 408—heat-resistant; poor corrosion resistance; 11% chromium, 8% nickel.
- Type 409—cheapest type; used for automobile exhausts; ferritic (iron/chromium only).
- Type 410—martensitic (high-strength iron/chromium). Wear-resistant, but less corrosion-resistant.
- Type 416—easy to machine due to additional sulfur
- Type 420—Cutlery Grade martensitic; similar to the Brearley's original rustless steel. Excellent polishability.
- Type 430—decorative, e.g., for automotive trim; ferritic. Good formability, but with reduced temperature and corrosion resistance.
- Type 439—ferritic grade, a higher grade version of 409 used for catalytic converter exhaust sections. Increased chromium for improved high temperature corrosion/oxidation resistance.
- Type 440—a higher grade of cutlery steel, with more carbon, allowing for much better edge retention when properly heat-treated. It can be hardened to approximately Rockwell 58 hardness, making it one of the hardest stainless steels. Due to its toughness and relatively low cost, most display-only and replica swords or knives are made of 440 stainless. Available in four grades:
  - Type 440A—has the least amount of carbon making this the most stain-resistant.
  - Type 440B—slightly more carbon than 440A.
  - Type 440C—has the greatest amount of carbon of the type 440 variants. Strongest and considered more desirable in knifemaking than the Type 440A variant, except for diving or other salt-water applications. This variant is also more readily available than other variants of type 440.
  - Type 440F—a free-machining variant. Contains the same high carbon content as type 440C.
- Type 446—ferritic designed for elevated temperature service and is capable of tolerating molten copper and brass.

=== 600 Series—originally created for proprietary alloys (which are no longer given SAE grade numbers) ===
- 601 through 604: Martensitic low-alloy steels.
- 610 through 613: Martensitic secondary hardening steels.
- 614 through 619: Martensitic chromium steels.
- 630 through 635: Semiaustenitic and martensitic precipitation hardening stainless steels.
  - Type 630 is most common PH stainless, better known as 17-4; 17% chromium, 4% nickel.
- 650 through 653: Austenitic steels strengthened by hot/cold work.
- 660 through 665: Austenitic superalloys; all grades except alloy 661 are strengthened by second-phase precipitation.

=== 900 series—austenitic chromium-molybdenum alloys ===
- Type 904—similar to 316 but with higher chromium and molybdenum content for more corrosion resistance

== Stainless steel designations table ==
Stainless steel designations
Designation		Composition by weight (%)								
SAE	UNS	Cr	Ni	C	Mn	Si	P	S	N	Other
Austenitic
201	S20100	16–18	3.5–5.5	0.15	5.5–7.5	0.75	0.06	0.03	0.25	-
202	S20200	17–19	4–6	0.15	7.5–10.0	0.75	0.06	0.03	0.25	-
205	S20500	16.5–18	1–1.75	0.12–0.25	14–15.5	0.75	0.06	0.03	0.32–0.40	-
254	S31254	20	18	0.02 max.	-	-	-	-	0.20	6 Mo; 0.75 Cu; "Super austenitic"; All values nominal
301	S30100	16–18	6–8	0.15	2	0.75	0.045	0.03	-	-
302	S30200	17–19	8–10	0.15	2	0.75	0.045	0.03	0.1	-
302B	S30215	17–19	8–10	0.15	2	2.0–3.0	0.045	0.03	-	-
303	S30300	17–19	8–10	0.15	2	1	0.2	0.15 min.	-	Mo 0.60 (optional)
303Se	S30323	17–19	8–10	0.15	2	1	0.2	0.06	-	0.15 Se min.
304	S30400	18–20	8–10.50	0.08	2	0.75	0.045	0.03	0.1	-
304L	S30403	18–20	8–12	0.03	2	0.75	0.045	0.03	0.1	-
304Cu	S30430	17–19	8–10	0.08	2	0.75	0.045	0.03	-	3–4 Cu
304N	S30451	18–20	8–10.50	0.08	2	0.75	0.045	0.03	0.10–0.16	-
305	S30500	17–19	10.50–13	0.12	2	0.75	0.045	0.03	-	-
308	S30800	19–21	10–12	0.08	2	1	0.045	0.03	-	-
309	S30900	22–24	12–15	0.2	2	1	0.045	0.03	-	-
309S	S30908	22–24	12–15	0.08	2	1	0.045	0.03	-	-
310	S31000	24–26	19–22	0.25	2	1.5	0.045	0.03	-	-
310S	S31008	24–26	19–22	0.08	2	1.5	0.045	0.03	-	-
314	S31400	23–26	19–22	0.25	2	1.5–3.0	0.045	0.03	-	-
316	S31600	16–18	10–14	0.08	2	0.75	0.045	0.03	0.10	2.0–3.0 Mo
316L	S31603	16–18	10–14	0.03	2	0.75	0.045	0.03	0.10	2.0–3.0 Mo
316F	S31620	16–18	10–14	0.08	2	1	0.2	0.10 min.	-	1.75–2.50 Mo
316N	S31651	16–18	10–14	0.08	2	0.75	0.045	0.03	0.10–0.16	2.0–3.0 Mo
317	S31700	18–20	11–15	0.08	2	0.75	0.045	0.03	0.10 max.	3.0–4.0 Mo
317L	S31703	18–20	11–15	0.03	2	0.75	0.045	0.03	0.10 max.	3.0–4.0 Mo
321	S32100	17–19	9–12	0.08	2	0.75	0.045	0.03	0.10 max.	Ti 5(C+N) min., 0.70 max.
329	S32900	23–28	2.5–5	0.08	2	0.75	0.04	0.03	-	1–2 Mo
330	N08330	17–20	34–37	0.08	2	0.75–1.50	0.04	0.03	-	-
347	S34700	17–19	9–13	0.08	2	0.75	0.045	0.030	-	Nb + Ta, 10 × C min., 1 max.
348	S34800	17–19	9–13	0.08	2	0.75	0.045	0.030	-	Nb + Ta, 10 × C min., 1 max., but 0.10 Ta max.; 0.20 Ca
384	S38400	15–17	17–19	0.08	2	1	0.045	0.03	-	-
Designation		Composition by weight (%)								
SAE	UNS	Cr	Ni	C	Mn	Si	P	S	N	Other
Ferritic
405	S40500	11.5–14.5	-	0.08	1	1	0.04	0.03	-	0.1–0.3 Al, 0.60 max.
409	S40900	10.5–11.75	0.5	0.08	1	1	0.045	0.03	-	Ti 6 × (C + N)
409Ni	S40975	10.5–11.75	0.5-1.0	0.03	1	1	0.045	0.03	-	Ti 6 × (C + N)
429	S42900	14–16	0.75	0.12	1	1	0.04	0.03	-	-
430	S43000	16–18	0.75	0.12	1	1	0.04	0.03	-	-
430F	S43020	16–18	-	0.12	1.25	1	0.06	0.15 min.	-	0.60 Mo (optional)
430FSe	S43023	16–18	-	0.12	1.25	1	0.06	0.06	-	0.15 Se min.
434	S43400	16–18	-	0.12	1	1	0.04	0.03	-	0.75–1.25 Mo
436	S43600	16–18	-	0.12	1	1	0.04	0.03	-	0.75–1.25 Mo; Nb+Ta 5 × C min., 0.70 max.
442	S44200	18–23	-	0.2	1	1	0.04	0.03	-	-
446	S44600	23–27	0.25	0.2	1.5	1	0.04	0.03	-	-
Designation		Composition by weight (%)								
SAE	UNS	Cr	Ni	C	Mn	Si	P	S	N	Other
Martensitic
403	S40300	11.5–13.0	0.60	0.15	1	0.5	0.04	0.03	-	-
410	S41000	11.5–13.5	0.75	0.15	1	1	0.04	0.03	-	-
414	S41400	11.5–13.5	1.25–2.50	0.15	1	1	0.04	0.03	-	-
416	S41600	12–14	-	0.15	1.25	1	0.06	0.15 min.	-	0.060 Mo (optional)
416Se	S41623	12–14	-	0.15	1.25	1	0.06	0.06	-	0.15 Se min.
420	S42000	12–14	-	0.15 min.	1	1	0.04	0.03	-	-
420F	S42020	12–14	-	0.15 min.	1.25	1	0.06	0.15 min.	-	0.60 Mo max. (optional)
422	S42200	11.0–12.5	0.50–1.0	0.20–0.25	0.5–1.0	0.5	0.025	0.025	-	0.90–1.25 Mo; 0.20–0.30 V; 0.90–1.25 W
431	S41623	15–17	1.25–2.50	0.2	1	1	0.04	0.03	-	-
440A	S44002	16–18	-	0.60–0.75	1	1	0.04	0.03	-	0.75 Mo
440B	S44003	16–18	-	0.75–0.95	1	1	0.04	0.03	-	0.75 Mo
440C	S44004	16–18	-	0.95–1.20	1	1	0.04	0.03	-	0.75 Mo
Designation		Composition by weight (%)								
SAE	UNS	Cr	Ni	C	Mn	Si	P	S	N	Other
Heat resisting
501	S50100	4–6	-	0.10 min.	1	1	0.04	0.03	-	0.40–0.65 Mo
502	S50200	4–6	-	0.1	1	1	0.04	0.03	-	0.40–0.65 Mo
Martensitic precipitation hardening
630	S17400	15–17	3–5	0.07	1	1	0.04	0.03	-	Cu 3–5, Ta 0.15–0.45

== See also ==
- ASTM International
- Steel grades
- Unified numbering system
