= SAF 2205 =

Duplex stainless steel

SAF 2205, is a Alleima-owned trademark (Formerly Sandvik Materials Technology) for a 22Cr duplex (ferritic-austenitic) stainless steel. SAF derives from Sandvik Austenite Ferrite. The nominal chemical composition of SAF 2205 is 22% chromium, 5% nickel, 3.2% molybdenum and other alloying elements such as nitrogen and manganese. The UNS designation for SAF 2205 is S31803/S32205 and the EN steel no. is 1.4462. SAF 2205 or Duplex 2205 is often used as an alternative to expensive 904L stainless steel owing to similar properties but cheaper ingredients. Duplex stainless steel is available in multiple forms like bars, billets, pipes, tubes, sheets, plates and even processed to fittings and flanges.

Typical properties of SAF 2205 duplex stainless steel are:

- high resistance to stress corrosion cracking (SCC) in chloride-bearing environments
- high resistance to stress corrosion cracking (SCC) in environments containing hydrogen sulphide
- high resistance to general corrosion, pitting corrosion, and crevice corrosion
- high resistance to erosion corrosion and corrosion fatigue
- high mechanical strength - roughly twice the proof strength of austenitic stainless steel
- good weldability

Duplex 2205 Stainless Steel (both austenitic and ferritic) is used in applications that require strength and good corrosion resistance. S31803 was endorsed in year 1996 whereas it underwent number of changes that led to discovery of UNS S32205 which is more widely used. Possible alternates for SAF 2205 are 904L Stainless Steel, UR52N+, 6%Mo and 316L.

Applications of SAF 2205 are in the following industries:

- Transport, storage and chemical processing
- Processing equipment
- High chloride and marine environments
- Oil and gas exploration
- Paper machines, liquor tanks, pulp and paper digesters

== See also ==
- Duplex Stainless Steel
- Ferritic stainless steel
- List of steel producers
