= Marine grade stainless =

Type 316 austinitic alloy steel

Marine grade stainless alloys typically contain molybdenum to resist the corrosive effects of NaCl or salt in seawater. Concentrations of salt in seawater can vary, and splash zones can cause concentrations to increase dramatically from the spray and evaporation.

SAE 316 stainless steel is a molybdenum-alloyed steel and the second most common austenitic stainless steel (after grade 304). It is the preferred steel for use in marine environments because of its greater resistance to pitting corrosion than most other grades of steel without molybdenum. The fact that it is negligibly responsive to magnetic fields means that it can be used in applications where a non-magnetic metal is required.

== 316 alloys ==
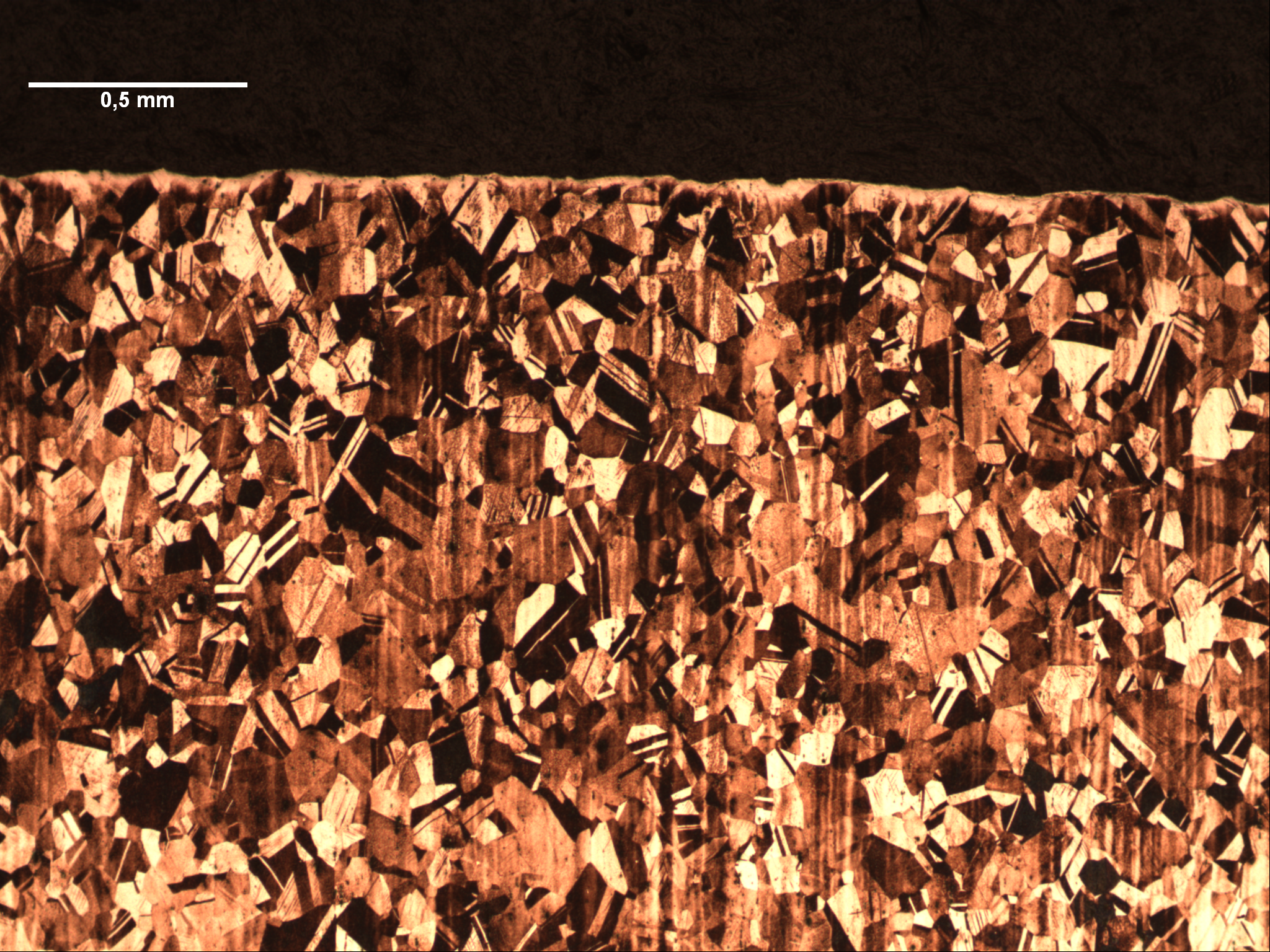
316 alloy crystal microstructure

While 316 is not completely rust-proof, the alloy is more corrosion resistant than other common stainless steels. For example, surgical steel is made from subtypes of 316 stainless steel. In addition to molybdenum, 316 also contains a number of other elements in varying concentrations (see table below).

Stainless steel designations
SAE	Proportion by weight (%)									Description and uses
SAE	Cr	Ni	C	Mn	Si	P	S	N	Mo	Description and uses
316	16–18	10–14	0.08	2	0.75	0.045	0.03	0.10	2.0–3.0	General grade for food processing, chemical storage and transport, textile dying equipment, cladding of nuclear fuel, and oil refining equipment as well as some medical implants.
316L	16–18	10–14	0.03	2	0.75	0.045	0.03	0.10	2.0–3.0	Low-carbon grade for handling paper pulp as well as the production of rayon, rubber, textile bleaches, and high-temperature industrial equipment. This is the preferred grade for medical implants as it is resistant to sensitization (grain boundary carbide precipitation).
316F	16–18	10–14	0.08	2	1	0.2	0.10 min	-	1.75–2.5	Free-machining grade with reduced molybdenum and correspondingly increased phosphorus and sulfur for automatic machine screw parts as well as surgical implants and pharmaceutical processing equipment.
316N	16–18	10–14	0.08	2	0.75	0.045	0.03	0.10–0.16	2.0–3.0	High-nitrogen grade with increased resistance to pitting and to corrosion in crevices. Used for chemical handling accessories.

Non-standard grades include 316H which has a "high" carbon content of greater than 0.04% giving it a high creep rupture strength at high temperatures, 316L(Hi)N which is an extra-high nitrogen grade (0.16—0.30%), 316Ti which is stabilized by titanium, 316Cb which is stabilized by niobium (the code comes from "columbium", the former name, prevalent in the U.S., of niobium), 316L-SCQ which is a high-purity version of 316L, and 316LS which specially adapted for surgical implants.

== Suitability for marine use ==
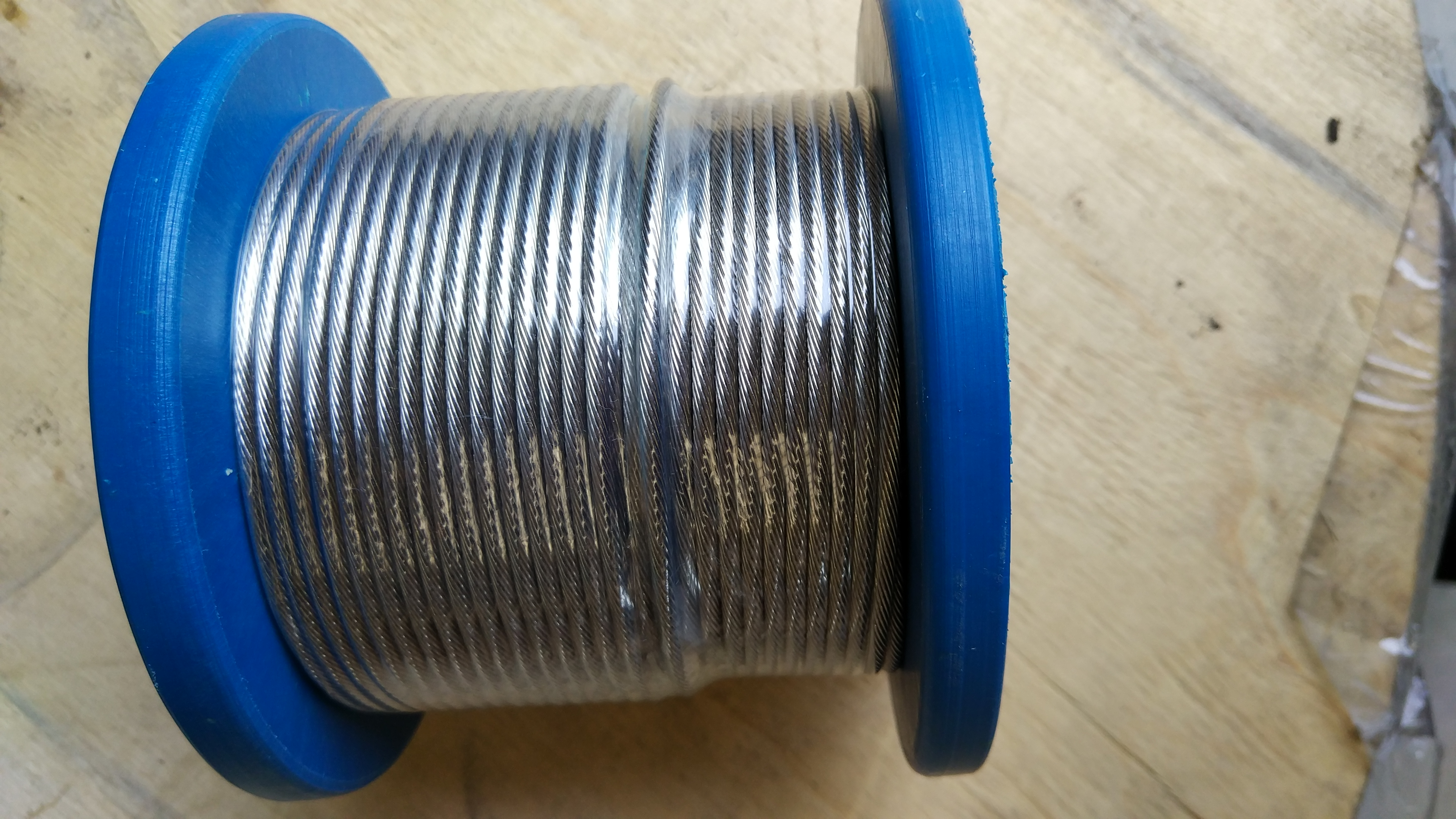
316 wire rope for marine industry

There is no industry recognized definition for a marine grade stainless steel, even though the phrase is routinely used by many end-users. Chloride ions can cause localized corrosive attack (pitting and crevice corrosion) of susceptible stainless steels. In a marine environment it must be made clear as to whether the stainless steel is submerged in seawater, or is simply near enough to the seashore such that it can be attacked by the chloride present in seawater by splashing or carried by onshore breeze.

When the stainless steel will be submerged, a pitting resistance equivalent number greater than 40 is typically specified as the minimum for resistance to seawater. Stainless steels, such as super austenitic stainless steels (for example UNS S31254 or N08367), or super duplex stainless steels (for example UNS S32760 or S32750) meet this requirement.

Near the seashore 316L is typically considered the minimum grade for use in such a marine environment. 316 and 316L, although used commonly in marine applications, are not suitable for condenser tubes in seawater as they're susceptible to crevice and pitting corrosion under such usage.

Concentrations of chloride in seawater can vary, and splash zones can cause concentrations to increase dramatically by evaporation, thus the corrosive severity of marine environments can vary. The resistance of any stainless steel near the seashore will also be dependent on whether the stainless surface can be rinsed by rainfall, which will reduce the tendency for surface chlorides to concentrate by evaporation. Thus, the underside of overhangs will be more susceptible to corrosion due to lack of rinsing, also desert locations near the seashore will typically be more corrosive than seashores in locations with high rainfall.

== Other marine grade alloys ==
Nitronic (trade name): Nitronic 50 is a fully austenitic grade (super austenitic, low magnetism), even when cold worked. Nitronic 60 is an example of a non-molybdenum grade performing well in seawater, being more resistant to pitting in sea water than 316 due to high levels of Si and N; the N also increases the yield strength.

== See also ==
- SAE steel grades
- SAE 316L stainless steel

== Notes ==
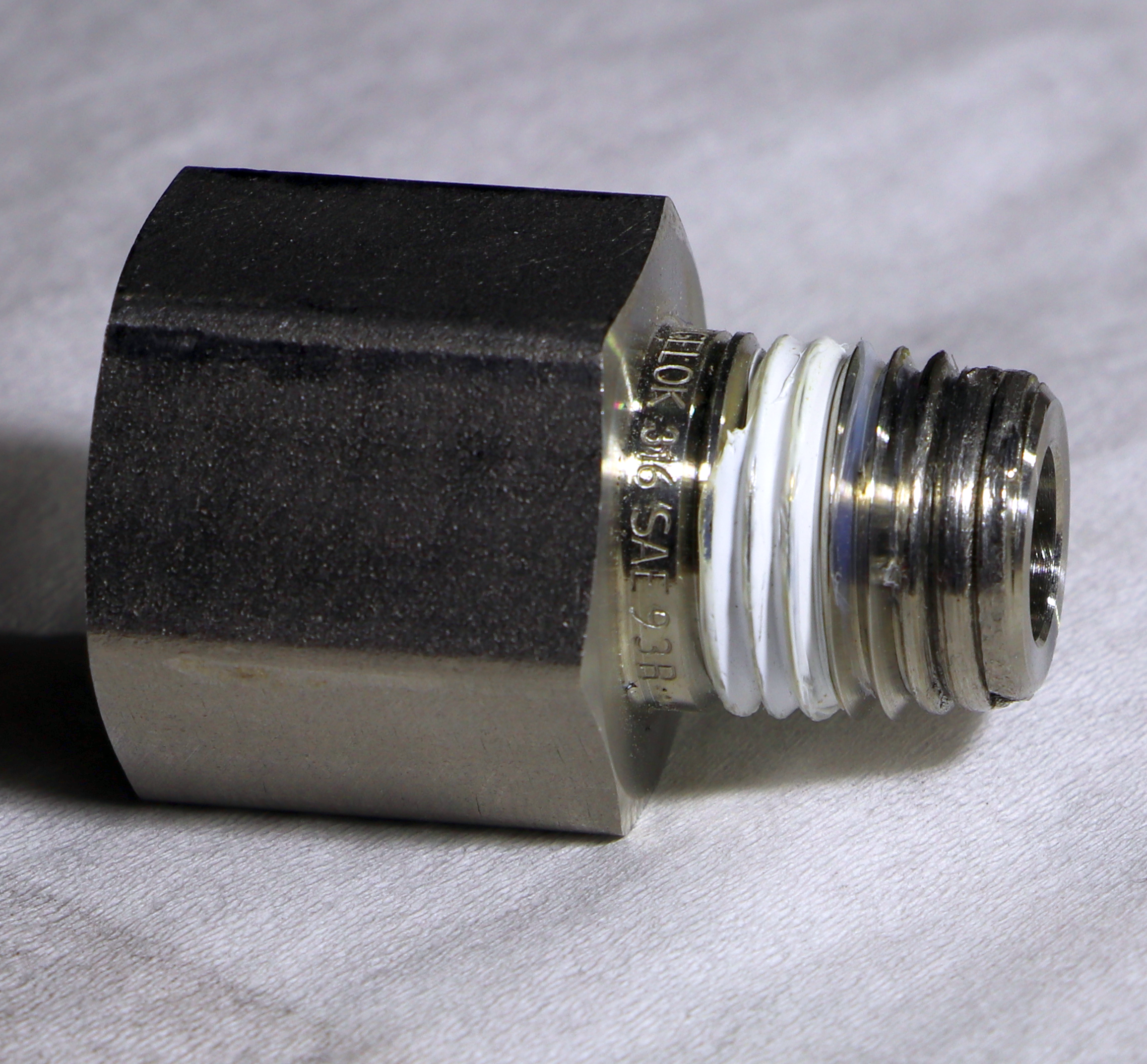
Galled NPT threads on a stainless steel fitting that was tightened too much

Visible evidence of corrosive attack in a marine environment is known as "tea staining".

Like other grades of stainless steel, marine grade stainless steel is a relatively poor conductor of both heat and of electricity when compared to metals and other conductive materials.
