= Alloy 20 =

Austinitic specialty stainless steel

Alloy 20 is an austenitic stainless steel containing less than 50% iron developed for applications involving sulfuric acid. Its corrosion resistance also finds other uses in the chemical, petrochemical, power generation, and plastics industries. Alloy 20 resists pitting and chloride ion corrosion, better than 304 stainless steel and on par with 316L stainless steel. Its copper content protects it from sulfuric acid. Alloy 20 is often chosen to solve stress corrosion cracking problems, which may occur with 316L stainless. Alloy of the same name with the designation "Cb-3" indicates niobium (also known as columbium) stabilized.

== Composition ==
- Nickel, 32–38%
- Chromium, 19–21%
- Carbon, 0.06% maximum
- Copper, 3–4%
- Molybdenum, 2–3%
- Manganese, 2% maximum
- Silicon, 1.0% maximum
- Niobium, (8.0 X C), 1% maximum
- Iron, 31–44% (balance)

== Other names ==
- UNS N08020
- DIN 2.4660
- CN7M
- Carpenter 20 CB-3
- AL 20
- Carlson Alloy C20
- Nickelvac 23
- Nicrofer 3620 Nb, also known as VDM Alloy 20

== Specifications ==
- ASTM - A182, A240, A312, A351, A743, B366, B462, B463, B464(Withdrawn in 2025, See A312), B473, B729(Withdrawn in 2025)
- ASME - SB729, SB464, SB366, SB473, SB462, SA 182, SA351
- ANSI / ASTM A555-79
- EN 2.4660
- UNS N08020
- Werkstoff 2.4660
- Castings are designated CN7M
