= Steel grades =

Classification system

Steel grades are grades used to classify various steels by their composition and physical properties. Steel grades have been developed by a number of standards organizations.

== Steel grades standards by country ==
- For alloys in general (including steel), unified numbering system (UNS) of ASTM International and the Society of Automotive Engineers (SAE).
- American steel grades : AISI/SAE steel grades standard
- British Standards
- International Organization for Standardization ISO/TS 4949:2016
- European standards – EN 10027
- Japanese steel grades : Japanese Industrial Standards (JIS) standard and NK standard
- Germany steel grades : DIN standard
- China steel grades : GB standard
- Czech steel grades : ČSN standard
- Russia steel grades : GOST standard
- Spain steel grades : UNE standard
- France steel grades : AFNOR standard
- Italy steel grades : UNI standard
- Sweden steel grades : SIS standard
- Norway steel grades : DNV standard

Note that an increasing number of national European standards (DIN, AFNOR, UNE, UNI, etc.) and UK standards are being withdrawn and replaced by European Standards (EN). This task is carried out by the Comité Européen de Normalisation (CEN) (European Committee for Standardization).

== European standard steel grades ==
EN 10027-1 steel grade designation system.

European standard steel grade names fall into two categories:

1. Steel specified by purpose of use and mechanical properties.
2. Steel specified by chemical composition.

The inclusion of a letter 'G' before the code indicates the steel is specified in the form of a casting.

=== Category 1: Steel specified by purpose of use and mechanical properties ===
Basic grade designations for category 1 steels consist of a single letter (designating application) then a number signifying the mechanical property (often yield strength) dictated in the standard for that application designation. For some application designations another letter is included before the property value, this number is used to indicate any special requirements or conditions. These additional letters and values depend entirely on the application of the steel and are specified in the standard and far too numerous to mention here.

The next set of 3 digits gives the steel's minimum yield strength. So S355 has a minimum yield strength of 355 MPa for the smallest thickness range covered by the relevant standard – i.e. EN10025.

Below is a table indicating the most common application codes.

Application symbol	Meaning	Mechanical Property	Details
S	Structural steel	Minimum Yield Strength	
P	Steel for pressure lines and vessels	Minimum Yield Strength	
L	Steel for pipe and tube	Minimum Yield Strength	
E	Engineering steels	Minimum Yield Strength	
B	Steel for reinforced concrete	Characteristic Yield Case	
R	Steel for rail use	Minimum Yield Case	
H	High Tensile Strength Flat products	Minimum Yield Case	If followed by T then the given mechanical property is minimum tensile strength
D	Flat Products for Cold Forming		Followed by C, D or X and two numbers characterising steel
T	Tinmill Products	Nominal Yield Case	
M	Electrical Steel		Number = 100 × specific loss in W/kg Number = 100 × nom thick in mm Letter for type of product (A, K, P or S)

==== Additional symbols ====
In addition to the above category codes there are symbols that can be added to the grade code to identify any additional compositional requirements, delivery conditions, mechanical properties, &c. These values depend solely on the type/application code given in the first part of the code and are so numerous as to be impossible to indicate here. Additional symbols are separated from the main code by the plus sign (+).

The most common additional symbols are the impact and temperature codes for structural steels, category 1 - Sxxx.

Impact Resistance		Temperature	
Impact code	Testing strength	Temperature code	Testing temperature
J	27 J	R	Room temperature
K	40 J	0	0 °C
L	60 J	2	-20 °C
		3	-30 °C
		4	-40 °C
		5	-50 °C
		6	-60 °C

Example : S355J2

Delivery condition codes are also relatively common, the most common being:

Code	Condition
A	Annealed
QT	Quenched and tempered
N	Normalised
SR	Stress relieved
C	Cold worked
U	Untreated
G	Deoxidated

Example : S355J2+N

==== Electrical steel ====
Electrical steel type of product letters (bold are most recent version 2016):

Code	Maximum specific loss expressed for magnetic induction	Type of product
A	1.5 T @50 Hz	non oriented
D (formerly B)	"	non-alloy semi-finished (not finally annealed)
E	"	alloy semi-finished (not finally annealed)
K (=D+E)	"	non-alloy and alloy electrical steel sheet/strip in the semi-processed state
N	"	for normal grain oriented products
P	1.7 T @50 Hz	high permeability grain oriented
S	"	conventional grain oriented

==== Standard per steel name ====
According to EN 10027-1

Application	Mechanical property	additional symbol	Standard
S	235	JR	EN 10025-2
S	355	JR	EN 10025-2
S	355	J0	EN 10025-2
S	355	J2	EN 10025-2
S	355	K2	EN 10025-2
S	355	N	EN 10025-3
S	355	NL	EN 10025-3
S	450	J0	EN 10025-2
P	265	GH	EN 10028-2
P	265	NB	EN 10120
P	355	NH	EN 10028-3
P	355	M	EN 10028-5
P	355	ML1	EN 10028-5
P	355	Q	EN 10028-6

=== Category 2: Steel specified by chemical composition ===
In addition to the descriptive steel grade naming system indicated above, within EN 10027-2 is defined a system for creating unique steel grade numbers. While less descriptive and intuitive than the grand names they are easier to tabulate and use in data processing applications.

The number is in the following format: x.yyzz(zz)
Where x is the material type (only 1 is specified so far), yy is the steel group number (specified in EN10027-2) and zz(zz) is a sequential number designated by the certifying body, the number in brackets being unused but reserved for later use.

The steel groups are indicated below:

Code	Type
Non-alloy steels
00 & 90	Basic steels
0x & 9x	Quality steels
1x	Special steels
Alloy steels
2x	Tool steels
3x	Miscellaneous steels
4x	Stainless and heat resistant steels
5x – 8x	Structural, pressure vessel and engineering steels
08 & 98	Special physical properties
09 & 99	Other purpose steels

The current certification body is the VDEh in Düsseldorf, Germany.

== Comparisons ==
Below is a table comparing steel grades from different grading systems.

Comparison of steel grades by chemistry
EN steel number (Europe)	EN steel name (Europe)	ASTM grade (USA)	AISI/SAE grade (USA)	UNS (USA)	DIN (Germany)	BS (UK)	UNI (Italy)	JIS (Japan)
Carbon steels
1.1141; 1.0401; 1.0453	C15D; C18D		1010; 1018		CK15; C15; C16.8	040A15; 080M15; 080A15; EN3B	C15; C16; 1C15	S12C; S15; S15CK; S15C
1.0503; 1.1191; 1.1193; 1.1194	C45		1045		C45; CK45; CF45; CQ45	060A47; 080A46; 080M46	C45; 1C45; C46; C43	S45C; S48C
1.0726; 1.0727	35S20; 45S20		1140/1146		35S20; 45S20	212M40; En8M		
1.0715; 1.0736	11SMn37		1215		9SMn28; 9SMn36	230M07; En1A	CF9SMn28; CF9SMn36	SUM 25; SUM 22
1.0718; 1.0737	11SMnPb30; 11SMnPb37		12L14		9SMnPb28; 9SMnPb36	230M07 Leaded; En1B Leaded	CF9SMnPb29; CF9SMnPb36	SUM 22; SUM 23; SUM 24
1.1555	C120U				C125W	BW1C	C120KU	SK2
Alloy steels
1.7218			4130		25CrMo4; GS-25CrMo4	708A30; CDS110	25CrMo4 (KB); 30CrMo4	SCM 420; SCM 430; SCCrM1
1.7223; 1.7225; 1.7227; 1.3563	42CrMo4		4140/4142		41CrMo4; 42CrMo4; 42CrMoS4; 43CrMo4	708M40; 708A42; 709M40; En19; En19C	41CrMo4; 38CrMo4 (KB); G40 CrMo4; 42CrMo4	SCM 440; SCM 440H; SNB 7 SCM 4M; SCM 4
1.6582; 1.6562	34CrNiMo6		4340		34CrNiMo6; 40NiCrMo8-4	817M40; En24	35NiCrMo6 (KB); 40NiCrMo7 (KB)	SNCM 447; SNB24-1-5
1.6543; 1.6523	20NiCrMo2-2		8620		21NiCrMo22; 21NiCrMo2	805A20; 805M20	20NiCrMo2	SNCM 200 (H)
1.5415	16Mo3	A204 A/B/C		K12822; K12320; K12020; K11820	15Mo3	1503-243B; 240; 243	15Mo3; 16Mo3	STBA12
Stainless steels
1.4310	X10CrNi18-8		301	S30100				
1.4318	X2CrNiN18-7		301LN					
1.4305	X8CrNiS18-9		303	S30300	X10CrNiS18-9	303S 31; En58M	X10CrNiS18-09	SUS 303
1.4301	X2CrNi19-11; X2CrNi18-10		304	S30400	X5CrNi18-9; X5CrNi18-10; XCrNi19-9	304S 15; 304S 16; 304S 18; 304S 25; En58E	X5CrNi18-10	SUS 304; SUS 304-CSP
1.4306	X2CrNi19-11		304L	S30403		304S 11		SUS304L
1.4311	X2CrNiN18-10		304LN	S30453				
1.4948	X6CrNi18-11		304H	S30409				
1.4303	X5CrNi18-12		305	S30500				
1.4401; 1.4436	X5CrNiMo17-12-2; X5CrNiMo18-14-3		316	S31600	X5CrNiMo17 12 2 X5CrNiMo17 13 3 X5CrNiMo 19 11; X5CrNiMo 18 11	316S 29; 316S 31; 316S 33; En58J	X5CrNiMo17 12; X5CrNiMo17 13; X8CrNiMo17 13	SUS 316; SUS316TP
1.4404	X2CrNiMo17-12-2		316L	S31603		316S 11		SUS316L
1.4406; 1.4429	X2CrNiMoN17-12-2; X2CrNiMoN17-13-3		316LN	S31653				
1.4462	X2CrNiMoN22.5.3			S31803 S32205	X2CrNiMoN22.5.3			
1.4571			316Ti	S31635	X6CrNiMoTi17-12	320S 33		
1.4438	X2CrNiMo18-15-4		317L	S31703				
1.4541			321	S32100	X6CrNiTi18-10	321S 31		SUS321
1.4848	GX40CrNiSi25-20	A351 HK40		J94204	SEW 595 GX40CrNiSi25-20	310C40		SCH22
1.4859	GX10NiCrSiNb32-20			N08151	GX10NiCrSiNb32-20			
1.4878	X12CrNiTi18-9; X8CrNiTi18-10		321H	S32109				
1.4906	X7CrNiNb18-10		347H	S34709				
1.4512	X6CrTi12		409	S40900				SUH409
			410	S41000				
1.4016			430	S43000	X6Cr17	430S 17		SUS430
			440A	S44002				
1.4112			440B	S44003				
1.4125			440C	S44004	X105CrMo17			SUS440C
1.4104			430F	S44020	X14CrMoS17			SUS430F
1.4057	X17CrNi16-2		431 X	S43100	X16CrNi16	431S 29		SUS431
1.5423	16Mo5	A335 P1	4520; 4419H; 4419	K11522	16Mo5			STPA12
1.7715	14MoV6-3	A335 P2		K11547	14MoV6-3	660		STPA20
1.7335; 1.7338	13CrMo4-5; 10CrMo5-5	A335 P11		K11597				STPA23
1.7375; 1.7380; 1.7383	10CrMo9-10; 11CrMo9-10; 12CrMo9-10	A335 P22		K21590	17175 10CrMo910			STPA24
1.7362; 1.7366	X11CrMo5; X12CrMo5; 12CrMo19-5	A335 P5	501; 502	K41545; S50100; S50200				STPA25
1.7386	X11CrMo9-1; X12CrMo9-1	A335 P9	503	S50400; S50488; K90941				STPA26
1.4903	X10CrMoVNbN9-1	A335 P91		K91560	X10CrMoVNbN9-1			
1.4905; 1.4906	X11CrMoWVNb9-1-1; X12CrMoWVNbN10-1-1	A335 P92		K92460	X11CrMoWVNb9-1-1; X12CrMoWVNbN10-1-1			
1.4539	X1NiCrMoCu25-20-5		904L	N08904				
1.4547	X1CrNiMoCuN20-18-7			S31254				
1.4565			NIT50	S20910				
			NIT60	S21800				
Tool steels
1.2363	X100CrMoV5		A-2	T30102	X100CrMoV51	BA 2	X100CrMoV5-1 KU	SKD 12
			A-3	T30103				
			A-4	T30104				
			A-6	T30106				
			A-7	T30107				
			A-8	T30108				
			A-9	T30109				
1.2365	X32CrMoV3-3; 32CrMoV12-28		H10	T20810	X32CrMoV3-3; 32CrMoV12-28			SKD 7
1.2379	X153CrMoV12		D-2		X153CrMoV12-1	BD 2	X155CrVMo12-1	SKD 11
1.2510			O-1		100MnCrW4	Bo 1	95MnWCr-5 KU	

== American Petroleum Institute (API) steel grades ==
The American Petroleum Institute has a standardized steel grading system for various properties of steel composites.

=== Color coding ===
In order to clearly distinguish the steel grade, tubing, casing and its coupling should be painted with color codes respectively. Color bands should be painted on tubing and casing body longer than 600mm to either end. The whole outer-body of the coupling needs to be painted color and then color codes.

	Steel Grade	Coupling	Tubular Body
API Tubing and Casing	H40	None	None or black band at the manufacturer's option
API Tubing and Casing	J55	all green.	one green band
API Tubing and Casing	K55	all green	two green bands
API Tubing and Casing	N80-1	all red	one red band
API Tubing and Casing	N80-Q	all red + one green band	one red band + one green band
API Tubing and Casing	L80-1	all red + one brown band	one red band + one brown band
API Tubing and Casing	L80-9Cr	colorless + two yellow bands	one red band + one brown band + two yellow bands
API Tubing and Casing	L80-13Cr	colorless + one yellow band	one red band + one brown band + one yellow band
API Tubing and Casing	C90-1	all purple	one purple band
API Tubing and Casing	T95-1	all silver	one silver band
API Tubing and Casing	C110	all white + two brown bands	one white band + two brown bands
API Tubing and Casing	P110	all white	one white band
API Tubing and Casing	Q125	all orange	one orange band

API 5B and 5CT provide various steel grades and color codes of each grade, with general information of casing and tubing.
