= SS316 =

SS316 may refer to:

- USS Barbel (SS-316), a Balao-class submarine
- Grade 316 (stainless steel), a family of SAE marine steel grade
