= UB6 =

UB6 may refer to:

- UB6, a postcode district in the UB postcode area
- SM UB-6, World War I German submarine
- UB6, a grade of stainless steel, also known by other designations as grade 904L or 1.4539
