= Surgical stainless steel =

Grade of stainless steel used in biomedical applications

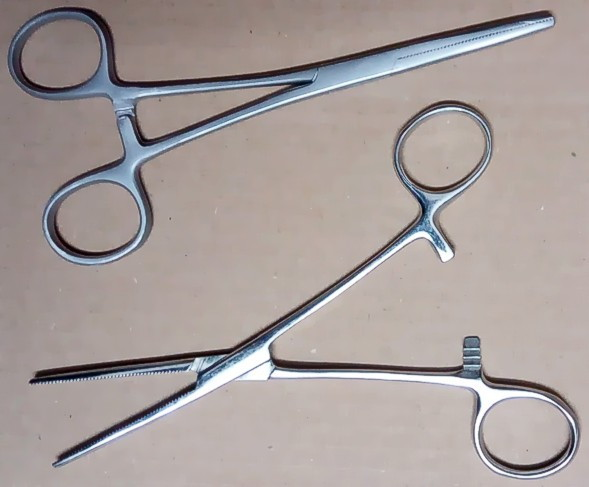

Surgical stainless steel is a grade of stainless steel used in biomedical applications. The most common "surgical steels" are austenitic SAE 316 stainless and martensitic SAE 440, SAE 420, and 17-4 stainless steels. There is no formal definition on what constitutes a "surgical stainless steel", so product manufacturers and distributors often apply the term to refer to any grade of corrosion resistant steel.

== Medical grade stainless ==
SAE 316 and SAE 316L stainless steel, also referred to as marine grade stainless, is a chromium, nickel, molybdenum alloy of steel that exhibits relatively good strength and corrosion resistance. 316L is the low carbon version of 316 stainless steel.

316L in particular is biocompatible when produced to ASTM F138 / F139. It is a common choice for biomedical implants, as well as body piercings and body modification implants. Immune system reaction to nickel is a potential complication of stainless steel usage within the human body. There are nickel-free nitrogen-strengthened austenitic stainless steel alloys available which address this concern.

316 surgical steel is also used in the manufacture and handling of food and pharmaceutical products where it is often required in order to minimize metallic contamination.

The corrosion resistance properties of all stainless steels is greatly enhanced by the passivation process. ASTM A967 details this process.

== Cutlery grade stainless ==
SAE 440 and SAE 420 stainless steels, known also by the name "Cutlery Stainless Steel", are high carbon steels alloyed with chromium. They have very good corrosion resistance compared to other cutlery steels, but their corrosion resistance is inferior to 316 stainless. Surgical cutting instruments are often made from 440 or 420 stainless due to its high hardness coupled with acceptable corrosion resistance. This type of stainless steel may be slightly magnetic.

General surgical tools are made from other chromium-bearing stainless steels, such as 17-4. ASTM F899 contains a list of commonly used metals for surgical instruments.

== See also ==
- Instruments used in general surgery
- SAE International
- ASTM International
