= SAE 310S stainless steel =

SAE 310S stainless steel is the low carbon version of 310 and is suggested for applications where sensitisation, and subsequent corrosion by high temperature gases or condensates during shutdown may pose a problem.

== Overview ==
SAE 310 stainless steel is a highly alloyed austenitic stainless steel used for high temperature application. The high chromium and nickel content give the steel excellent oxidation resistance as well as high strength at high temperature. This grade is also very ductile, and has good weldability enabling its widespread usage in many applications.

310/310S find wide application in all high-temperature environments where scaling and corrosion resistance, as well as high temperature strength and good creep resistance are required.

== Chemical composition ==
SAE	C	Mn	P	S	Si	Cr	Ni
310	0.24 max	2.0 max	0.045 max	0.030 max	1.5 max	24.0–26.0	19.0–22.0
310S	0.08 max	2.0 max	0.045 max	0.030 max	1.5 max	24.0–26.0	19.0–22.0

== See also ==
- 17-4 stainless steel
- Martensitic stainless steel
