= Ferritic stainless steel =

High chromium, low carbon stainless steel type

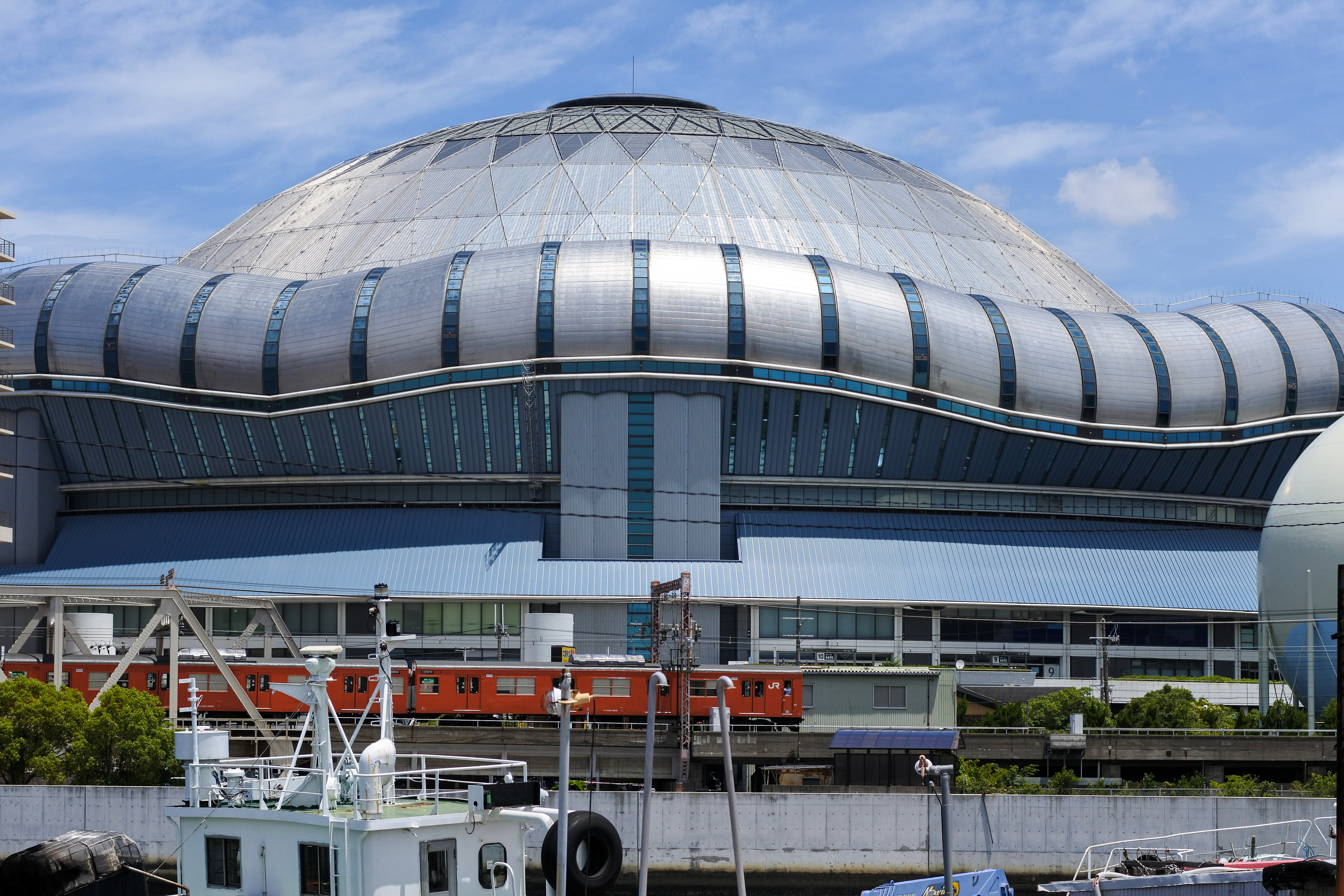
Ferritic stainless steel (SUS445J2) is used for the roof exterior of the Kyocera Dome Osaka, Japan.

Ferritic stainless steels are a family of stainless steels with a body-centered cubic (BCC) crystal structure and composed primarily of iron and chromium. They are characterized by being magnetic, non-hardenable by heat treating, and having excellent resistance to stress-corrosion cracking (SCC). Ferritic stainless steel alloys are designated as part of the 400-series of stainless steels in the SAE steel grades numbering system. By comparison with austenitic stainless steels, these are less hardenable by cold working and less weldable, but more cost-effective due to the lower nickel content.

== History ==
Canadian-born engineer Frederick Mark Becket (1875-1942) at Union Carbide industrialised ferritic stainless steel around 1912, on the basis of "using silicon instead of carbon as a reducing agent in metal production, thus making low-carbon ferroalloys and certain steels practical". He discovered a ferrous alloy with 25-27% Chromium that "was the first of the high-chromium alloys that became known as heat-resisting stainless steel."

Ferritic stainless steels were discovered early but it was only in the 1980s that the conditions were met for their growth:

- It was possible to obtain very low carbon levels at the steelmaking stage.
- Weldable grades were developed.
- Thermomechanical processing solved the problems of "roping" and "ridging" that led to inhomogenous deformation during deep drawing and to textured surfaces.
- End-user markets (such as that of domestic appliances) demanded less expensive grades with a more stable price at a time when there were large variations of the price of nickel. Ferritic stainless steel grades became attractive for some applications such as houseware.

== Metallurgy ==
Fe – Cr Phase diagram

To qualify as stainless steel, Fe-base alloys must contain at least 10.5% Cr.

The iron-chromium phase diagram shows that up to about 13% Cr, the steel undergoes successive transformations upon cooling from the liquid phase from ferritic α phase to austenitic γ phase and back to α. When some carbon is present, and if cooling occurs quickly, some of the austenite will transform into martensite. Tempering or annealing will transform the martensitic structure into ferrite and carbides.

Above about 17% Cr the steel will have a ferritic structure at all temperatures.

Above 25% Cr the sigma phase may appear for relatively long times at temperature and induce room temperature embrittlement.

== Common grades ==
- Type 409 contains lower chromium content and is primarily used for automotive exhaust systems
- Type 430 is the most common ferritic grade primarily used in kitchen appliances and general purpose applications
- Type 439 contains lower carbon and added titanium to resist carbide precipitation
- Type 444 contains molybdenum for improved corrosion resistance.

== Corrosion resistance ==
The pitting corrosion resistance of stainless steels is estimated by the pitting resistance equivalent number (PREN).

PREN = %Cr + 3.3%Mo + 16%N

Where the Cr, Mo, and N, terms correspond to the contents by weight % of chromium, molybdenum and nitrogen respectively in the steel.

Nickel has no role in the pitting corrosion resistance, so ferritic stainless steels can be as resistant to this form of corrosion as austenitic grades.

In addition, ferritic grades are very resistant to stress corrosion cracking (SCC).

== Mechanical properties ==
Ferritic stainless steels exhibit a ductile-brittle transition temperature (DBTT) which reduces its toughness at lower temperatures. They are also susceptible to 475 °C embrittlement which results in embrittlement and a loss of plasticity when heated in the range the range of 250 to 550 °C (480 to 1,020 °F). Ferritic stainless steels have low creep strength at temperatures above 500 °C.

== Physical properties ==
Ferritic stainless steels are magnetic. Compared to austenitic stainless steels, they offer a better thermal conductivity, a plus for applications such as heat exchangers. The thermal expansion coefficient, close to that of carbon steel, facilitates the welding to carbon steels.

== Applications ==
- Lower-cost of recent-production kitchenware
- White goods
- Solar heaters
- Slate hooks
- Coins
