= 440C =

Martensitic stainless steel type

440C (UNS designation S44004, EN10027 number 1.4125) is a martensitic 400 series stainless steel, and has the highest carbon content of the 400 stainless steel series. It can be heat treated to reach hardness of 58 to 60 HRC. It can be used to make rolling contact stainless bearings, e.g. ball bearings and roller bearings. It is also used to make knife blades.

440C has the highest strength, hardness, and wear resistance of all the commonplace 440-series stainless alloys, with high carbon content and moderate corrosion resistance.

== Composition ==
Chemical Composition (wt%)
| C | Cr | Mn | Si | Mo | P | S | Fe |
|---|---|---|---|---|---|---|---|
| 0.95-1.20 | 16.0-18.0 | 1.00 | 1.00 | 0.75 | 0.040 | 0.030 | Balance |

== Mechanical properties ==
Typical Mechanical Properties as a Bar
| Heat Treatment | Young's Modulus (GPa) | 0.2% Offset Yield Strength (MPa) | Tensile Strength (MPa) | Elongation (%) | Rockwell Hardness | CTE (0-100 °C) (μm/m) | Thermal Conductivity (at 100 °C) (W/m*K) |
|---|---|---|---|---|---|---|---|
| Annealed | 200 | 425 | 760 | 14 | 97 HRB | 10.2 | 24.2 |
| Tempered at 315 °C | 200 | 1900 | 1970 | 2 | 57 HRC | 10.2 | 24.2 |
