= Martensitic stainless steel =

One of the five families of stainless steel

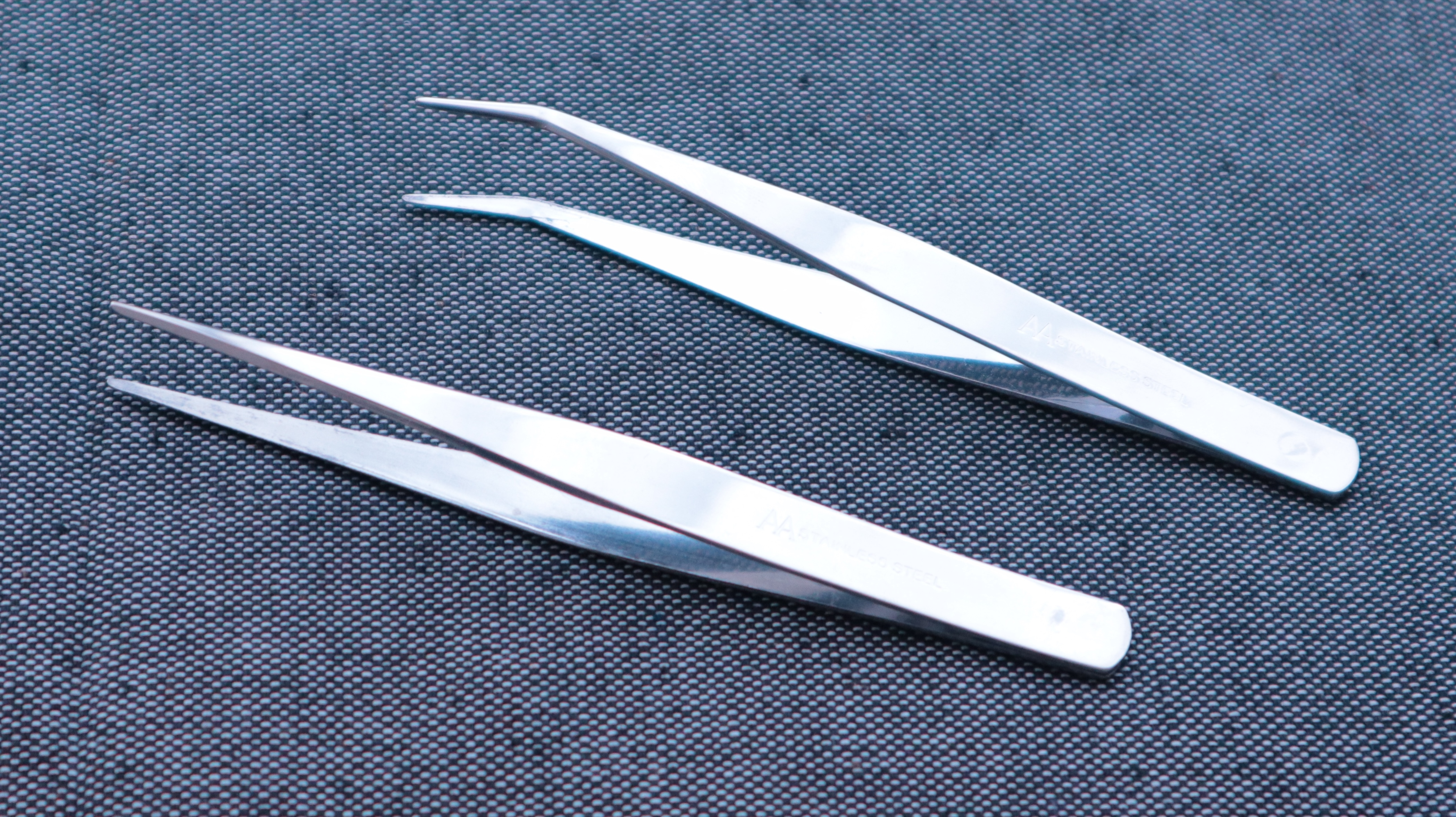
Tweezers made of 410 martensitic stainless steel

Martensitic stainless steels are a family of stainless steels having body-centered tetragonal (BCT) crystal structure and a predominantly martensite structure. They are characterized by being magnetic and having the ability to be hardened through heat treatment. Martensitic stainless steels are designated as part of the 400-series of stainless steels in the SAE steel grades numbering system.

== History ==
In 1912, Harry Brearley of the Brown-Firth research laboratory in Sheffield, England, while seeking a corrosion-resistant alloy for gun barrels, discovered and subsequently industrialized a martensitic stainless steel alloy. The discovery was announced two years later in a January 1915 newspaper article in The New York Times. Brearly applied for a U.S. patent during 1915. This was later marketed under the "Staybrite" brand by Firth Vickers in England and was used for the new entrance canopy for the Savoy Hotel in 1929 in London.

The characteristic body-centered tetragonal martensite microstructure was first observed by German microscopist Adolf Martens around 1890. In 1912, Elwood Haynes applied for a U.S. patent on a martensitic stainless steel alloy. This patent was not granted until 1919.

== Overview ==
Martensitic stainless steels can be high- or low-carbon steels built around the composition of iron, 12% up to 17% chromium, carbon from ≤0.05% (Type 415) up to 1.2% (Type 440C): The chromium and carbon contents are balanced to have a martensitic structure.

They may contain some nickel which allows a higher chromium or molybdenum content, thereby improving corrosion resistance and as the carbon content is also lower, the toughness is improved. Additions of boron, cobalt, niobium, and titanium improve the high temperature properties, particularly creep resistance.

== Common grades ==
- Type 410 is a general purpose grade containing 0.15% maximum carbon.
- Type 420 increases the carbon content to 0.15% minimum for improved strength
- Type 431 has added nickel content for improved corrosion resistance
- Types 440A, 440B and 440C increases the carbon content . Type 440C contains 0.95-1.20% carbon for highest hardness. Types 440B and 440A decreases the carbon content relative to Type 440C for improved toughness.

== Properties ==
=== Corrosion resistance ===
Martensitic stainless steels are generally resistant to corrosion only in relatively mild environments and have lower corrosion resistance compared to austenitic stainless steels.

=== Strength ===
Martensitic stainless alloys are hardenable by heat treatment, specifically by quenching and stress relieving, or by quenching and tempering (referred to as QT). The alloy composition, and the high cooling rate of quenching enable the formation of martensite. Untempered martensite is low in toughness and therefore brittle.Tempered martensite gives steel good hardness and high toughness as can be seen below, and is largely used for medical surgical instruments, such as scalpels, razors, and internal clamps.

=== Physical properties ===
Martensitic stainless steels are ferromagnetic due to their BCT crystal structure.

== Processing ==
When formability, softness, etc. are required in fabrication, steel having 0.12% maximum carbon is often used in soft condition. With increasing carbon, it is possible by hardening and tempering to obtain tensile strength in the range of 600 to 900 MPa (87 to 131 ksi), combined with reasonable toughness and ductility. In this condition, these steels find many useful general applications where mild corrosion resistance is required. Also, with the higher carbon range in the hardened and lightly tempered condition, tensile strength of about 1,600 MPa (230 ksi) may be developed with lowered ductility.

Martensitic stainless steel can be nondestructively tested using the magnetic particle inspection method, unlike austenitic stainless steel.

== Applications ==
Martensitic stainless steels, depending upon their carbon content are often used for their corrosion resistance and high strength. They are also used for their wear resistance.

- Up to about 0.4% C they are used mostly for their mechanical properties in applications such as pumps, valves, and shafts.
- Above 0.4% C they are used mostly for their wear resistance, such as in cutlery, surgical blades, plastic injection molds, and nozzles.

Grade EN 1.4313 (CA6NM) is used for nearly all the hydroelectric turbines in the world, including those of the huge "Three Gorges" dam in China.
