= Duplex stainless steel =

Stainless steel that has both austenitic and ferritic phases

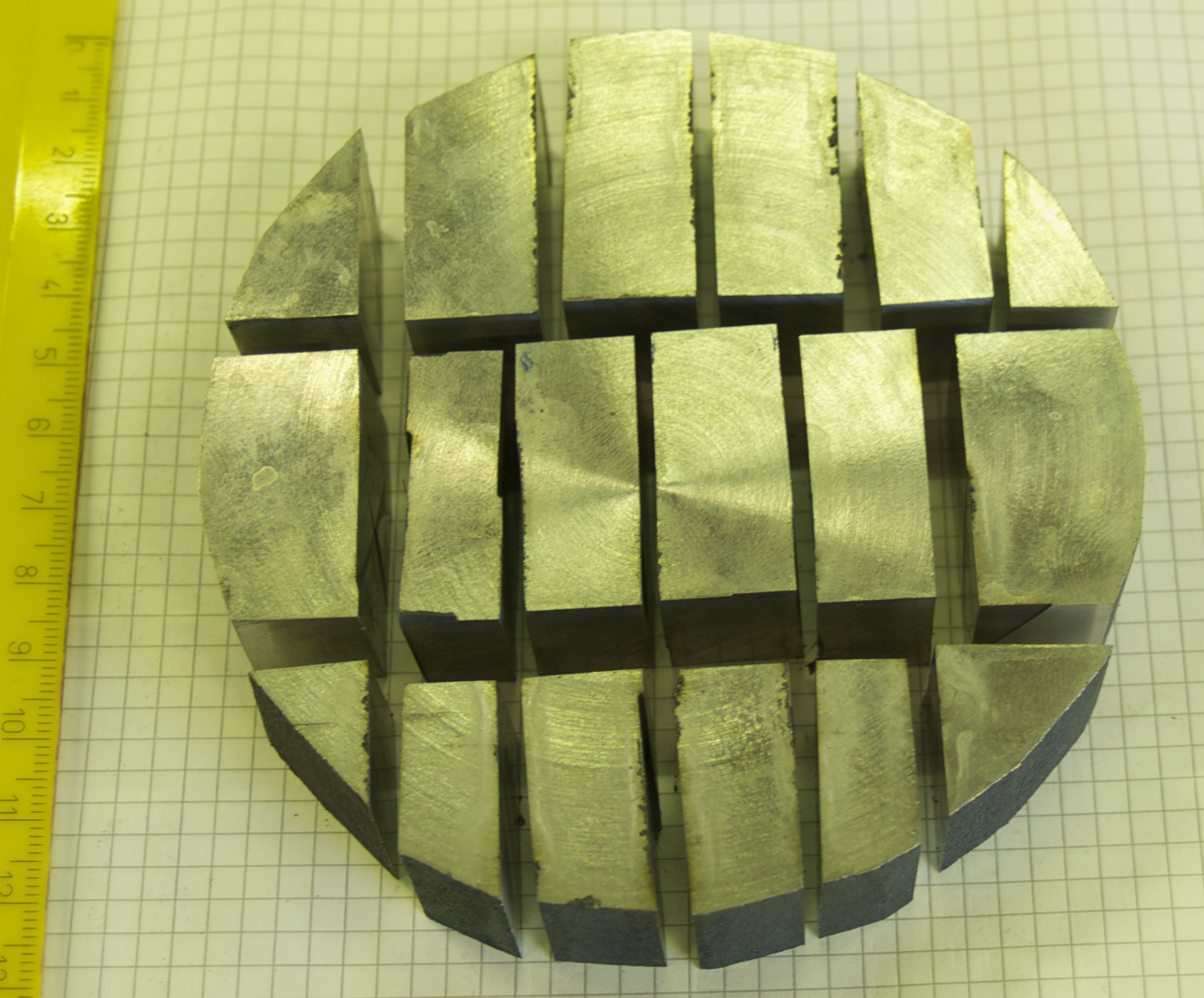
An ingot of 2507 duplex stainless steel

Duplex stainless steels are a family of stainless steels. These are called duplex (or austenitic-ferritic) grades because their metallurgical structure consists of two phases, austenite (face-centered cubic lattice) and ferrite (body centered cubic lattice) in roughly equal proportions.

They provide better corrosion resistance, particularly chloride stress corrosion and chloride pitting corrosion, and higher strength than standard austenitic stainless steels such as A2/304 or A4/316. The main differences in composition, when compared with austenitic stainless steel is that duplex steels have a higher chromium content, 20–28%; higher molybdenum, up to 5%; lower nickel, up to 9% and 0.05–0.50% nitrogen. Both the low nickel content and the high strength (enabling thinner sections to be used) give significant cost benefits. Duplex steels also have higher strength. For example, a Type 304 stainless steel has a 0.2% proof strength in the region of 280 MPa (41 ksi), a 22%Cr duplex stainless steel a minimum 0.2% proof strength of some 450 MPa (65 ksi) and a superduplex grade a minimum of 550 MPa (80 ksi).

Duplex steels are used extensively in the offshore oil and gas industry for pipework systems, manifolds, risers, etc. and in the petrochemical industry for pipelines and pressure vessels.

== Grades of duplex stainless steels ==
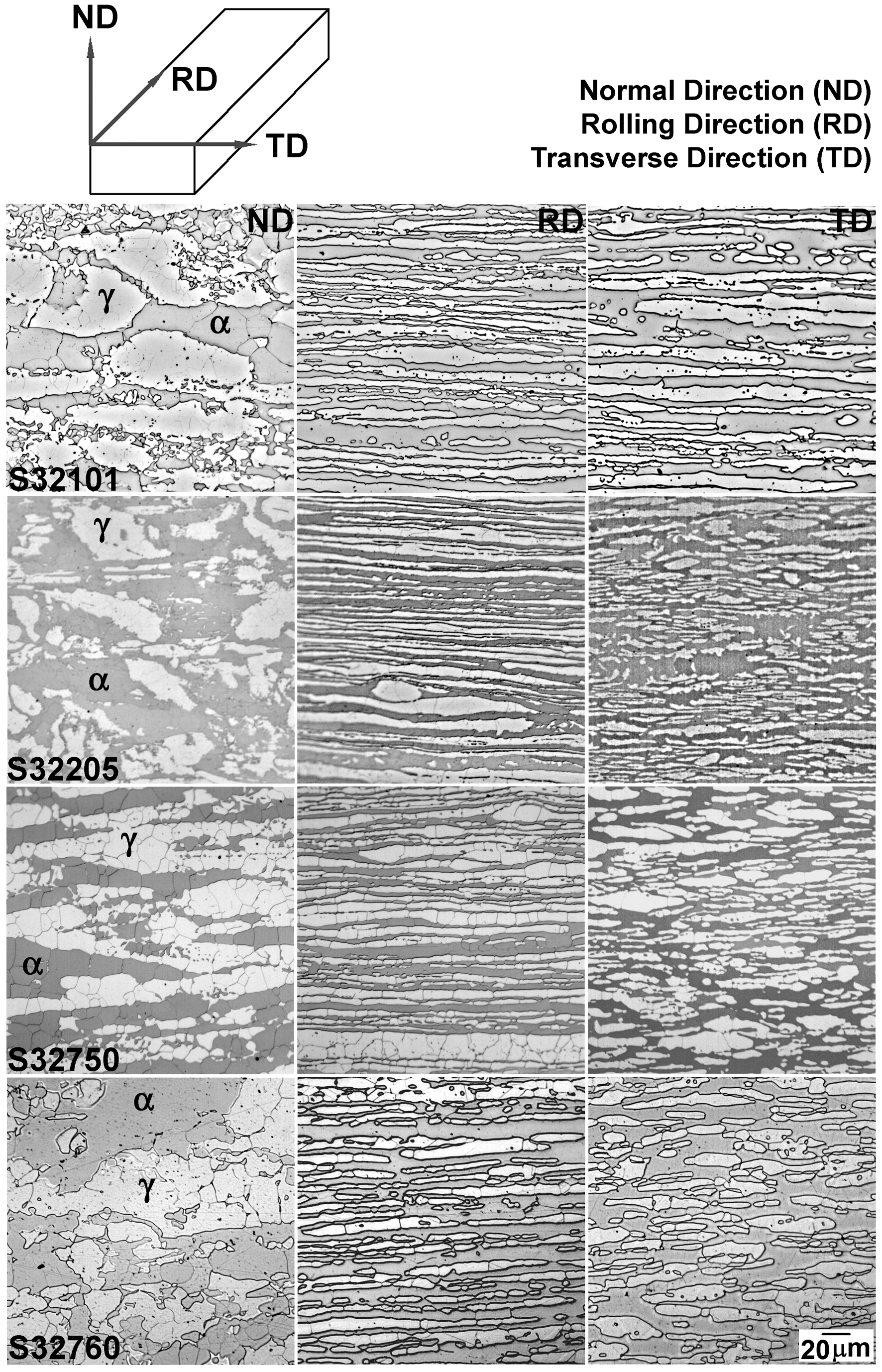
Microstructures of four kinds of duplex stainless steel in each direction

Duplex stainless steels are usually divided into three groups based on their pitting corrosion resistance, characterised by the pitting resistance equivalence number, PREN = %Cr + 3.3 %Mo + 16 %N.

Standard duplex (PREN range: 28–38)
Typically Grade EN 1.4462 (also called 2205). It is typical of the mid-range of properties and is perhaps the most used today
Super-duplex (PREN range: 38–45)
Typically grade EN 1.4410 up to so-called hyper duplex grades (PREN: >45) developed later to meet specific demands of the oil and gas as well as those of the chemical industries. They offer a superior corrosion resistance and strength but are more difficult to process because the higher contents of Cr, Mo, N and even W promote the formation of intermetallic phases, which reduce drastically the impact resistance of the steel. Faulty processing will result in poor performance and users are advised to deal with reputable suppliers/processors. Applications include deepwater offshore oil production.
Lean duplex grades (PREN range: 22–27)
Typically grade EN 1.4362, have been developed more recently for less demanding applications, particularly in the building and construction industry. Their corrosion resistance is closer to that of the standard austenitic grade EN 1.4401 (with a plus on resistance to stress corrosion cracking) and their mechanical properties are higher. This can be a great advantage when strength is important. This is the case in bridges, pressure vessels or tie bars.

== Chemical compositions ==
Chemicals composition of grades from EN 10088-1 (2014) Standard are given in the table below:

Composition by weight (%)
ISO Steel designation	EN Number	UNS equiv	C, max.	Si	Mn	P, max.	S, max.	N	Cr	Cu	Mo	Ni	Other
X2CrNiN22-2	1.4062	S32202	0.03	≤1.00	≤2.00	0.04	0.010	0.16 to 0.28	21.5 to 24.0	-	≤0.45	1.00 to 2.90	-
X2CrCuNiN23-2-2	1.4669		0.045	≤1.00	1.00 to 3.00	0.04	0.030	0.12 to 0.20	21.5 to 24.0	1.60 to 3.00	≤0.50	1.00 to 3.00	-
X2CrNiMoSi18-5-3	1.4424	S31500	0.03	1.40 to 2.00	1.20 to 2.00	0.035	0.015	0.05 to 0.10	18.0 to 19.0	-	2.5 to 3.0	4.5 to 5.2	-
X2CrNiN23-4	1.4362	S32304	0.03	≤1.00	≤2.00	0.035	0.015	0.05 to 0.20	22.0 to 24.5	0.10 to 0.60	0.10 to 0.60	3.5 to 5.5	-
X2CrMnNiN21-5-1	1.4162	S32101	0.04	≤1.00	4.0 to 6.0	0.040	0.015	0.20 to 0.25	21.0 to 22.0	0.10 to 0.80	0.10 to 0.80	1.35 to 1.90	-
X2CrMnNiMoN21-5-3	1.4482		0.03	≤1.00	4.0 to 6.0	0.035	0.030	0.05 to 0.20	19.5 to 21.5	≤1.00	0.10 to 0.60	1.50 to 3.50	-
X2CrNiMoN22-5-3	1.4462	S31803, S32205	0.03	≤1.00	≤2.00	0.035	0.015	0.10 to 0.22	21.0 to 23.0	-	2.50 to 3.50	4.5 to 6.5	-
X2CrNiMnMoCuN24-4-3-2	1.4662	S31803, S32205	0.03	≤0.70	2.5 to 4.0	0.035	0.005	0.20 to 0.30	23.0 to 25.0	0.10 to 0.80	1.00 to 2.00	3.0 to 4.5	
X2CrNiMoCuN25-6-3	1.4507	S32520	0.03	≤0.70	≤2.00	0.035	0.015	0.20 to 0.30	24.0 to 26.0	1.00 to 2.50	3.0 to 4.0	6.0 to 8.0	-
X3CrNiMoN27-5-2	1.4460	S31200	0.05	≤1.00	≤2.00	0.035	0.015	0.05 to 0.20	25.0 to 28.0	-	1.30 to 2.00	4.5 to 6.5	-
X2CrNiMoN25-7-4	1.4410	S32750	0.03	≤1.00	≤2.00	0.035	0.015	0.24 to 0.35	24.0 to 26.0	-	3.0 to 4.5	6.0 to 8.0	-
X2CrNiMoCuWN25-7-4	1.4501	S32760	0.03	≤1.00	≤1.00	0.035	0.015	0.20 to 0.30	24.0 to 26.0	0.50 to 1.00	3.0 to 4.0	6.0 to 8.0	W 0.50 to 1.00
X2CrNiMoN29-7-2	1.4477	S32906	0.03	≤0.50	0.80 to 1.50	0.030	0.015	0.30 to 0.40	28.0 to 30.0	≤0.80	1.50 to 2.60	5.8 to 7.5	-
X2CrNiMoCoN28-8-5-1	1.4658	S32707	0.03	≤0.50	≤1.50	0.035	0.010	0.30 to 0.50	26.0 to 29.0	≤1.00	4.0 to 5.0	5.5 to 9.5	Co 0.50 to 2.00
X2CrNiCuN23-4	1.4655	S32304	0.03	≤1.00	≤2.00	0.035	0.015	0.05 to 0.20	22.0 to 24.0	1.00 to 3.00	0.10 to 0.60	3.5 to 5.5	-

== Mechanical properties ==
Mechanical properties from European Standard EN 10088-3 (2014) (for product thickness below 160 mm):

Mechanical properties at room temperature of solution-annealed austenitic–ferritic stainless steels
ISO desig.	EN num.	0.2% proof stress, min	Ultimate tensile strength	Elongation, min (%)
X2CrNiN23-4	1.4362	400 MPa (58 ksi)	600 to 830 MPa (87 to 120 ksi)	25
X2CrNiMoN22-5-3	1.4462	450 MPa (65 ksi)	650 to 880 MPa (94 to 128 ksi)	25
X3CrNiMoN27-5-2	1.4460	450 MPa (65 ksi)	620 to 680 MPa (90 to 99 ksi)	20
X2CrNiN22-2	1.4062	380 MPa (55 ksi)	650 to 900 MPa (94 to 131 ksi)	30
X2CrCuNiN23-2-2	1.4669	400 MPa (58 ksi)	650 to 900 MPa (94 to 131 ksi)	25
X2CrNiMoSi18-5-3	1.4424	400 MPa (58 ksi)	680 to 900 MPa (99 to 131 ksi)	25
X2CrMnNiN21-5-1	1.4162	400 MPa (58 ksi)	650 to 900 MPa (94 to 131 ksi)	25
X2CrMnNiMoN21-5-3	1.4482	400 MPa (58 ksi)	650 to 900 MPa (94 to 131 ksi)	25
X2CrNiMnMoCuN24-4-3-2	1.4662	450 MPa (65 ksi)	650 to 900 MPa (94 to 131 ksi)	25
X2CrNiMoCuN25-6-3	1.4507	500 MPa (73 ksi)	700 to 900 MPa (100 to 130 ksi)	25
X2CrNiMoN25-7-4	1.4410	530 MPa (77 ksi)	730 to 930 MPa (106 to 135 ksi)	25
X2CrNiMoCuWN25-7-4	1.4501	530 MPa (77 ksi)	730 to 930 MPa (106 to 135 ksi)	25
X2CrNiMoN29-7-2	1.4477	550 MPa (80 ksi)	750 to 1,000 MPa (109 to 145 ksi)	25
X2CrNiMoCoN28-8-5-1*	1.4658	650 MPa (94 ksi)	800 to 1,000 MPa (120 to 150 ksi)	25

*for thickness ≤ 5 mm (0.20 in)

The minimum yield stress values are about twice as high as those of austenitic stainless steels.

Duplex grades are therefore attractive when mechanical properties at room temperature are important because they allow thinner sections.

== 475 °C embrittlement ==
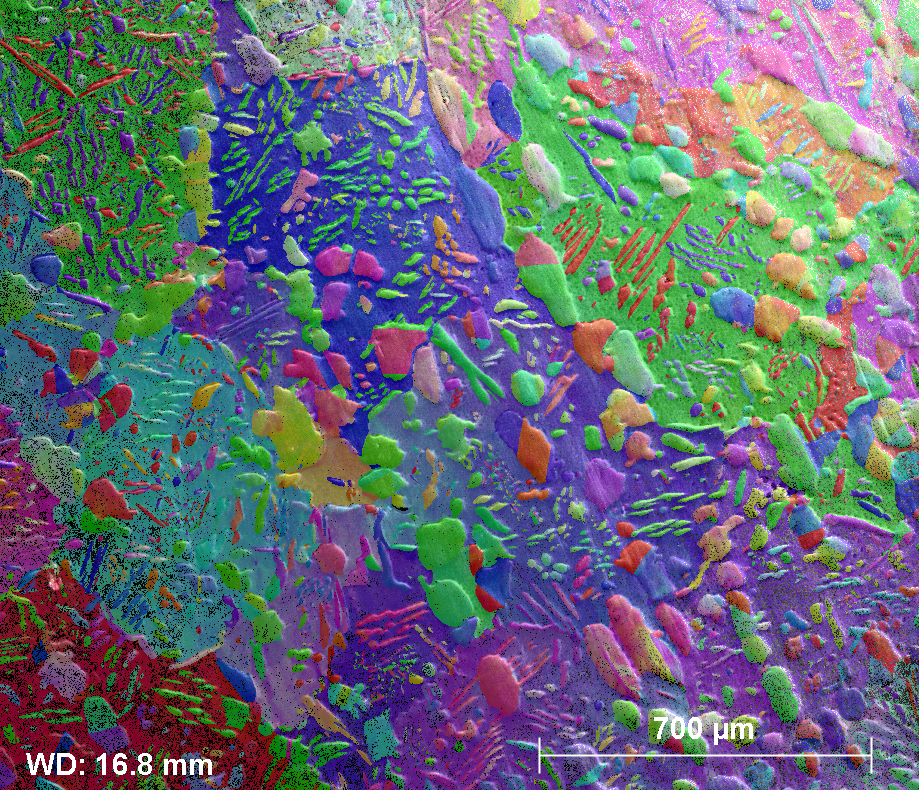
Electron backscatter diffraction map of 128 hrs age hardened duplex stainless steel with the ferrite phase forming the matrix and austenite grains sporadically spread. The ferrite phase volume fraction is 58%.

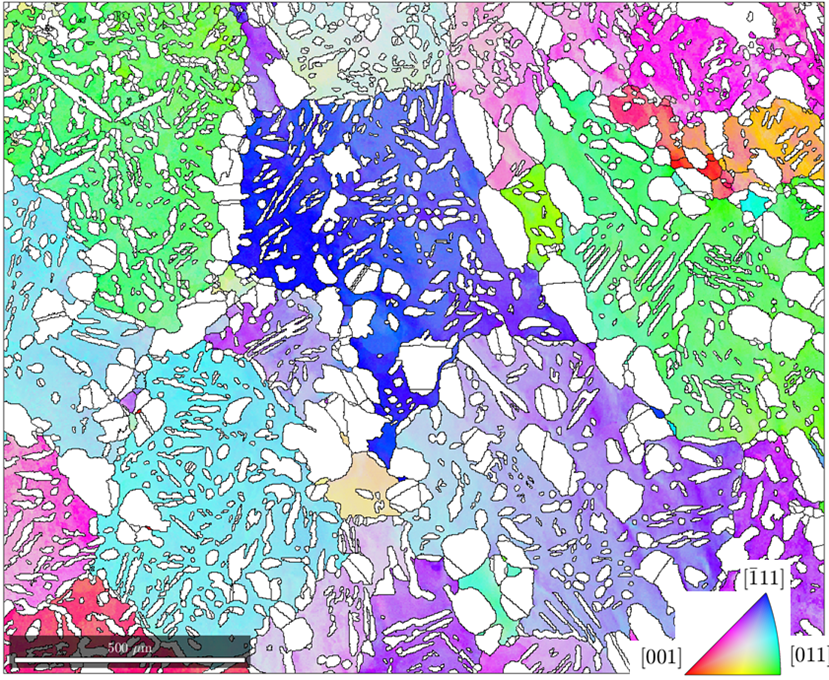
EBSD map with austenite grains excluded (white). The scale bar is 500 μm. Colours denote the crystal orientation and are taken from the inverse pole figure at the lower right corner.

Duplex stainless is widely used in the industry because it possesses excellent oxidation resistance but can have limited toughness due to its large ferritic grain size, and they have hardened, and embrittlement tendencies at temperatures ranging from 280 to 500 °C, especially at 475 °C, where spinodal decomposition of the supersaturated solid ferrite solution into Fe-rich nanophase ($\acute{a}$) and Cr-rich nanophase ($\acute{a}\acute{}$), accompanied by G-phase precipitation, occurs, which makes the ferrite phase a preferential initiation site for micro-cracks.

== Heat treatment ==
Recommended hot forming and annealing/soaking temperatures
UNS No. Grade	EN No.	Hot forming temperature range	Minimum soaking temperature
S32304	1.4362	1,150 to 950 °C (2,100 to 1,740 °F)	980 °C (1,800 °F)
S32205	1.4462	1,230 to 950 °C (2,250 to 1,740 °F)	1,040 °C (1,900 °F)
S32750	1.4410	1,235 to 1,025 °C (2,255 to 1,877 °F)	1,050 °C (1,920 °F)
S32520	1.4507	1,230 to 1,000 °C (2,250 to 1,830 °F)	1,080 °C (1,980 °F)
S32760	1.4501	1,230 to 1,000 °C (2,250 to 1,830 °F)	1,100 °C (2,010 °F)

Duplex stainless steel grades must be cooled as quickly as possible to room temperature after hot forming to avoid the precipitation of intermetallic phases (Sigma phase in particular) which drastically reduce the impact resistance at room temperature as well as the corrosion resistance.

Alloying elements Cr, Mo, W, Si increase the stability and the formation of intermetallic phases. Therefore, super duplex grades have a higher hot working temperature range and require faster cooling rates than the lean duplex grades.

== Additive manufacturing ==
Duplex stainless steels can also be produced by metal additive manufacturing. Parts built by laser powder bed fusion are almost fully ferritic in the as-built condition, and a post-build heat treatment is used to obtain a balanced ferrite–austenite microstructure. After heat treatment, such parts have shown corrosion behaviour in sodium chloride solution comparable to the wrought alloys.

Wire arc additive manufacturing (WAAM) is suited to large components because of its high deposition rate and low cost, and duplex grades such as 2205 and 2209 have been deposited this way. As with other WAAM-built stainless steels, the deposits often show anisotropy in microstructure and mechanical properties.

== Applications of duplex stainless steels ==
Duplex stainless steels are usually selected for their high mechanical properties and good to very high corrosion resistance (particularly to stress corrosion cracking).

- Architecture
  - Stockholm's waterfront building
  - Louvre Abu Dhabi
  - La Sagrada Familia
- Infrastructure:
  - Helix Bridge, Singapore
  - Cala Galdana bridge
  - Hong Kong–Zhuhai–Macau bridge and undersea tunnel
  - sea walls, piers, etc.
  - tunnels
- Oil and gas:
  - a wide range of equipment: flowlines, manifolds, risers, pumps, valves, etc.
- Pulp and paper:
  - digesters, pressure vessels, liquor tanks, etc.
- Chemical engineering:
  - pressure vessels, heat exchangers, condensers, distillation columns, agitators, marine chemical tankers, etc.
- Water:
  - desalination plants, large tanks for water storage, waste water treatment
- renewable energy: Biogas tanks
- Mobility: tramcars and bus frames, tank trucks, iron ore wagons
- Engineering: pumps, valves, fittings, springs, etc.
- Duplex and super-duplex stainless steels are also available in a variety of commercial product forms, including bars, pipes, plates, flanges, fittings, and fasteners. Frequently used grades, which are selected based on their mechanical strength and resistance to corrosion. These product forms and grades support a wide range of industrial applications, including chemical processing, marine, and offshore environments.

== See also ==
- Age-hardened duplex stainless steel
- Spinodal decomposition
