= 17-4 stainless steel =

Precipitation hardened stainless steel

SAE Type 630 stainless steel (more commonly known as 17-4 PH, or simply 17-4; also known as UNS S17400) is a grade of martensitic precipitation hardened stainless steel. It contains approximately 15–17.5% chromium and 3–5% nickel, as well as 3–5% copper. The name comes from the chemical makeup which is approximately 17% chromium and 4% nickel. SUS630 is the same as 17-4PH, and they both refer to the same grade.

== Properties ==
17-4 stainless steel can be heat treated to approximately 44 Rc, and an ultimate tensile strength of 1,300 MPa (190,000 psi).

Its density ranges from 7,800 to 7,900 kg/m^{3} (0.282 to 0.284 lb/cu in), and its modulus of elasticity ranges from 197 to 207 GPa (28.5×10^{6} to 30.0×10^{6} psi).

The corrosion resistance and machinability of 17-4 are comparable to austenitic 304 stainless steel. 17-4 is magnetic due to its martensitic structure.

Overaging (aging beyond the peak strength condition) improves resistance to stress corrosion cracking.

== Applications ==
17-4PH is used in applications requiring high strength, hardness, and corrosion resistance up to 300 °C (600 °F).

It is commonly used in the aerospace industry for its high strength, and in marine applications for its corrosion resistance, although it can be susceptible to crevice corrosion in stagnant salt water.

It is also used in the petroleum, chemical, medical device and firearm industries.

== Composition ==
Proportion by mass (%)
C	Mn	P	S	Si	Cr	Ni	Cu	Nb, Ta	Fe
0.07 max.	1.0 max.	0.04 max.	0.03 max.	1.0 max.	15.0–17.5	3.0–5.0	3.0–5.0	0.15–0.45	balance
