= SAE 304 stainless steel =

Most common stainless steel

SAE 304 Stainless Steel
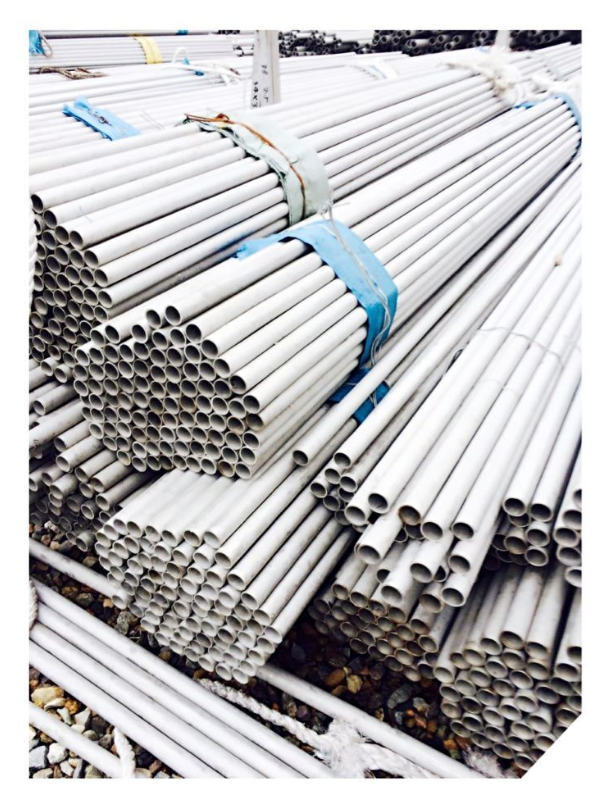
- 304 stainless steel pipes.
- Synonyms: A2
- Material type: Alloy

Alloy properties
- UNS identifier: UNS S30400
- SAE identifier: SAE 304
- Alloy type: Stainless Steel

Physical properties
- Density (ρ): 7,900 kg/m^{3} (0.286 lb/cu in)

Mechanical properties
- Young's modulus (E): 183 to 200 GPa (26.6×10^{6} to 29.0×10^{6} psi)
- Tensile strength (σ_{t}): 210 to 1,050 MPa (30,000 to 153,000 psi)
- Elongation (ε) at break: 70%
- Poisson's ratio (ν): 0.27

Thermal properties
- Melting temperature (T_{m}): 1,400 to 1,450 °C (2,550 to 2,650 °F)
- Specific heat capacity (c): 0.50 kJ/kg/°C (0.12 BTU/lb/°F)

SAE 304 stainless steel is the most common stainless steel. It is an alloy of iron, carbon, chromium and nickel. It is an austenitic stainless steel, and is therefore not magnetic. It is less electrically and thermally conductive than carbon steel. It has higher corrosion resistance than regular steel and is widely used because it is easy to form into various shapes.

The composition was developed by W. H. Hatfield at Firth Brown in 1924 and was marketed under the trade name "Staybrite 18/8".

It is specified by SAE International as part of its SAE steel grades. It is also known as:

- 4301-304-00-I and X5CrNi18-9, the ISO 15510 name and designation.
- UNS S30400 in the unified numbering system.
- A2 stainless steel outside the US, in accordance with ISO 3506 for fasteners.
- 18/8 and 18/10 stainless steel (also written 18-8 and 18-10) in the commercial tableware and fastener industries.
- SUS304 the Japanese JIS G4303 equivalent grade.
- 1.4301, the EN 10088 equivalent.
- 06Cr19Ni10 and ISC S30408, the equivalent in Chinese GB/T 20878 and GB/T 17616 nomenclature.
- 08Kh18N10 and 03Kh18N11, the equivalents for 403 and 403L in GOST nomenclature.

== Chemical composition ==
Type 304 stainless steel chemical composition, %wt
Standard	AISI (UNS)	C, ≤	Si, ≤	Mn, ≤	P, ≤	S, ≤	Cr	Ni
ASTM A276/A276M	304 (S30400)	0.08	1.00	2.00	0.045	0.030	18.0–20.0	8.0–11.0

== Corrosion resistance ==
304 stainless steel has excellent resistance to a wide range of atmospheric environments and many corrosive media. It is subject to pitting and crevice corrosion in warm chloride environments and to stress corrosion cracking above about 60 °C (140 °F). It is considered resistant to pitting corrosion in water with up to about 400 mg/L chlorides at ambient temperatures, reducing to about 150 mg/L at 60 °C.

304 stainless steel is also very sensitive at room temperature to the thiosulfate anions released by the oxidation of pyrite (as encountered in acid mine drainage) and can undergo severe pitting corrosion problems when in close contact with pyrite- or sulfide-rich clay materials exposed to oxidation.

For more severe corrosion conditions, when 304 stainless steel is too sensitive to pitting or crevice corrosion by chlorides or general corrosion in acidic applications, it is commonly replaced by 316 stainless steel. 304 and 302 stainless steels are subject to chloride stress fracture failure when used in tropical salt water conditions such as oil or gas rigs. 316 stainless steel is the preferred alloy for these conditions.

== Mechanical properties ==
304 stainless steel cannot be heat treated, instead it can be strengthened by cold working. It is weakest in the annealed condition, and is strongest in the full-hard condition. The tensile yield strength ranges from 210 to 1,050 MPa (30,000 to 153,000 psi).

The density is 7,900 kg/m^{3} (0.286 lb/cu in), and its modulus of elasticity ranges from 183 to 200 GPa (26.6×10^{6} to 29.0×10^{6} psi).

== Applications ==
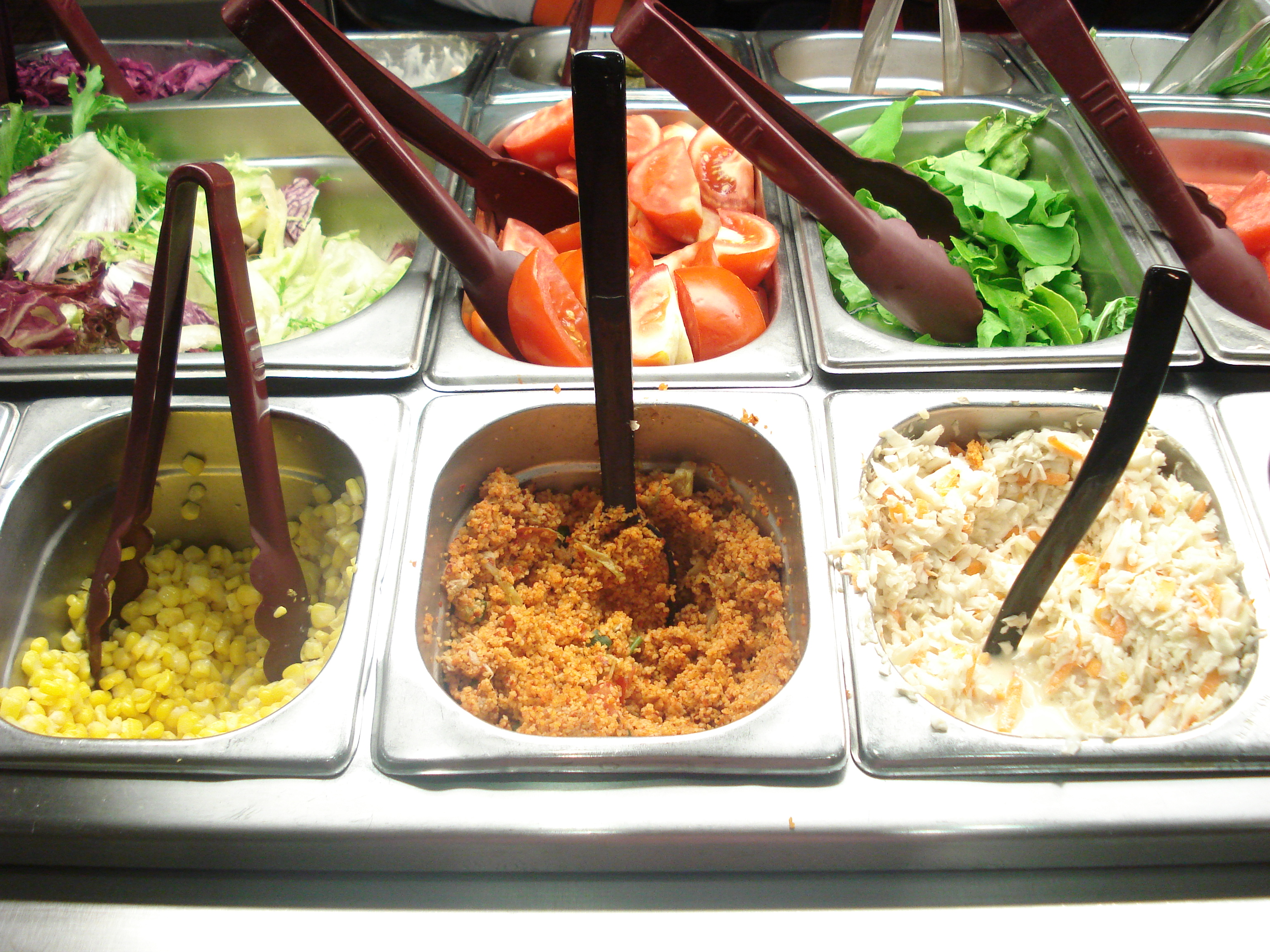
Staybrite containers in a salad bar

304 stainless steel is used for a variety of household and industrial applications such as food handling and processing equipment, screws, machinery parts, utensils, and exhaust manifolds. 304 stainless steel is also used in the architectural field for exterior accents such as water and fire features. It is also a common coil material for vaporizers.

Early SpaceX Starships used SAE 301 stainless steel in their construction, before moving over to SAE 304L for the SN7 test tank and Starship SN8 in 2020.

304 stainless steel was used to clad the Gateway Arch in St. Louis, Missouri.

== Carbon content ==
304, 304H, and 304L all possess the same nominal chromium and nickel content and also possess the same corrosion resistance, ease of fabrication, and weldability. The difference between 304, 304H, and 304L is the carbon content, which is < 0.08, < 0.1, and < 0.035% respectively (also see UNS designations S30400, S30409, & S30403 respectively). 304 has both the H=High and the L=Low carbon variants.

The carbon content of 304H (UNS S30409) is restricted to 0.04–0.10%, which provides optimal high-temperature strength.

The carbon content of 304L (UNS 30403) is restricted to a maximum of 0.035%, which prevents sensitization during welding. Sensitization is the formation of chromium carbides along grain boundaries when stainless steel is exposed to temperatures in the approximate range of 480–820 °C (900–1,500 °F). The subsequent formation of chromium carbide results in reduced corrosion resistance along the grain boundary, leaving the stainless steel susceptible to unanticipated corrosion in an environment where 304 would be expected to be corrosion resistant. This grain boundary corrosive attack is known as intergranular corrosion.

The carbon content of 304 (UNS 30400) is restricted to a maximum of 0.08% and is not useful for corrosive applications where welding is required, such as tanks and pipes where corrosive solutions are involved, and 304L is preferred. Its lack of a minimum carbon content is not ideal for high-temperature applications where optimal strength is required, thus, 304H is usually preferred. Therefore 304 is typically restricted to bars that will be machined into components where welding is not required or thin sheets that are formed in articles such as kitchen sinks or cookware that are also not welded.

Carbon content has a strong influence on room temperature strength and thus the specified minimum tensile properties of 304L are 34 MPa (5,000 psi) lower than for 304. However, nitrogen also has a strong influence on room temperature strength and a tiny addition of nitrogen produces 304L with the same tensile strength as 304. Thus, practically all 304L is produced as dual certified 304/304L, meaning it meets the maximum carbon content of 304L and also meets the minimum tensile strength of 304.

== See also ==
- Steel grades
- SAE 316L stainless steel
