= SAE 316L stainless steel =

Low carbon austenitic alloy

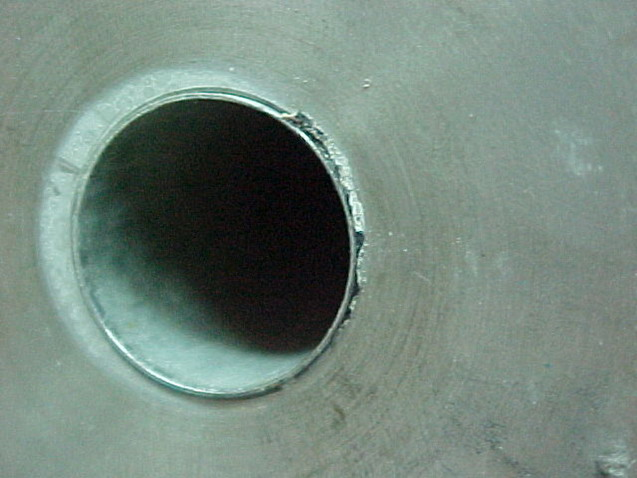
Crevice corrosion of 316 stainless steel from desalination.

SAE 316L stainless steel is an austenitic stainless steel and the second most common stainless steel after SAE 304 stainless steel. Its primary alloying constituents after iron are chromium (16–18%), nickel (10–12%), and molybdenum (2–3%). Up to 2% manganese and small (<1%) quantities of silicon, phosphorus, and sulfur are also present. The addition of molybdenum provides greater corrosion resistance than 304, with respect to localized corrosive attack by chlorides, hydrogen embrittlement and to general corrosion by reducing acids, and other acids such as sulfuric acid; while sulfur is added to improve ease-of-tooling/machinability. 316L grade is the low carbon version of 316 stainless steel, which improves relative corrosion-resistance. When cold worked, 316 can produce high yield and tensile strengths similar to duplex stainless steel grades.

It is commonly used in chemical and petrochemical industry, in food processing, pharmaceutical equipment, medical devices, jewellery, luxury watches (especially diver's watches), in potable water piping, wastewater treatment, in marine applications and architectural applications near the seashore or in urban areas.

== Gallery ==
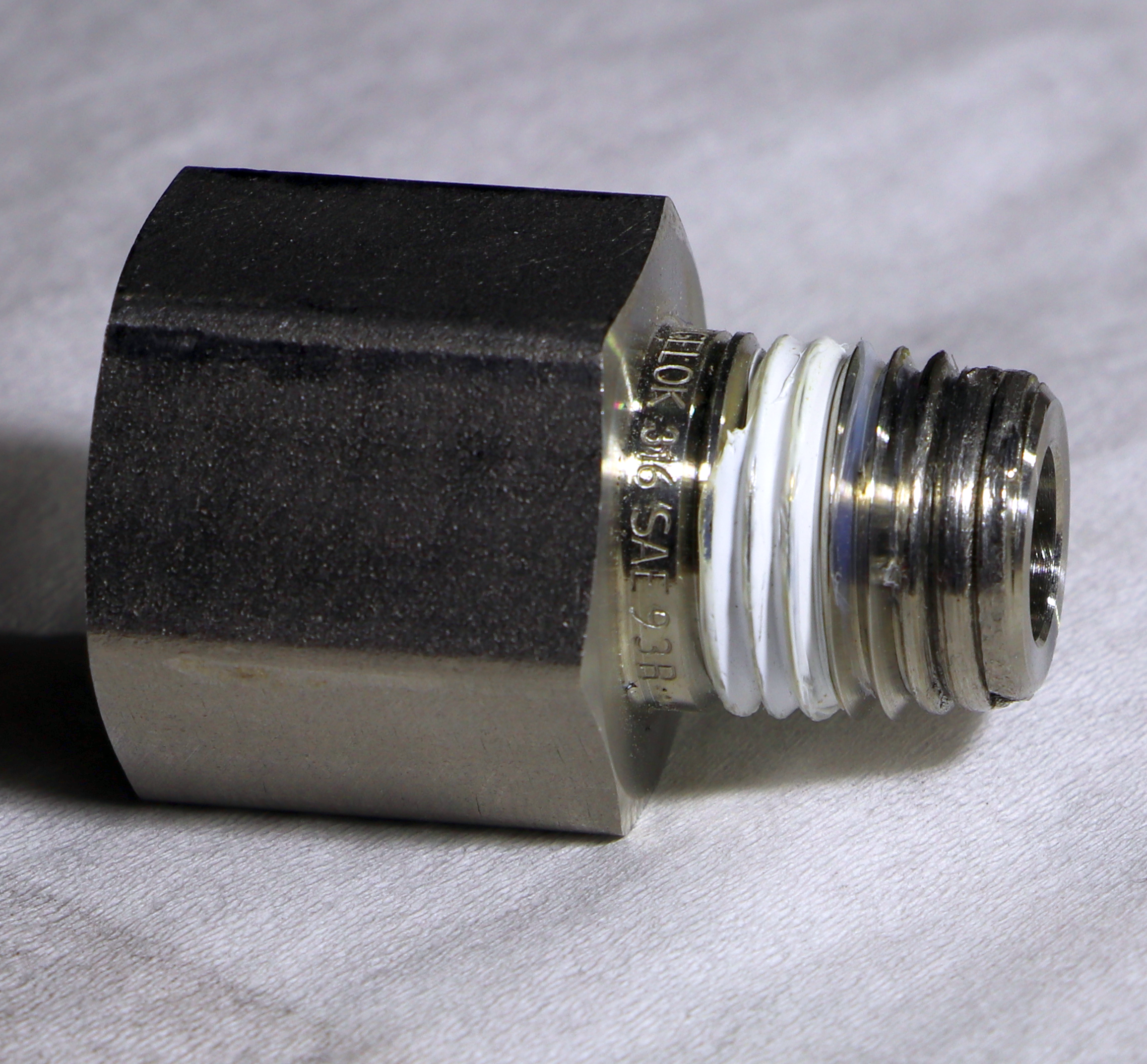
Pipe fitting of 316 steel (equivalent to A4 steel)

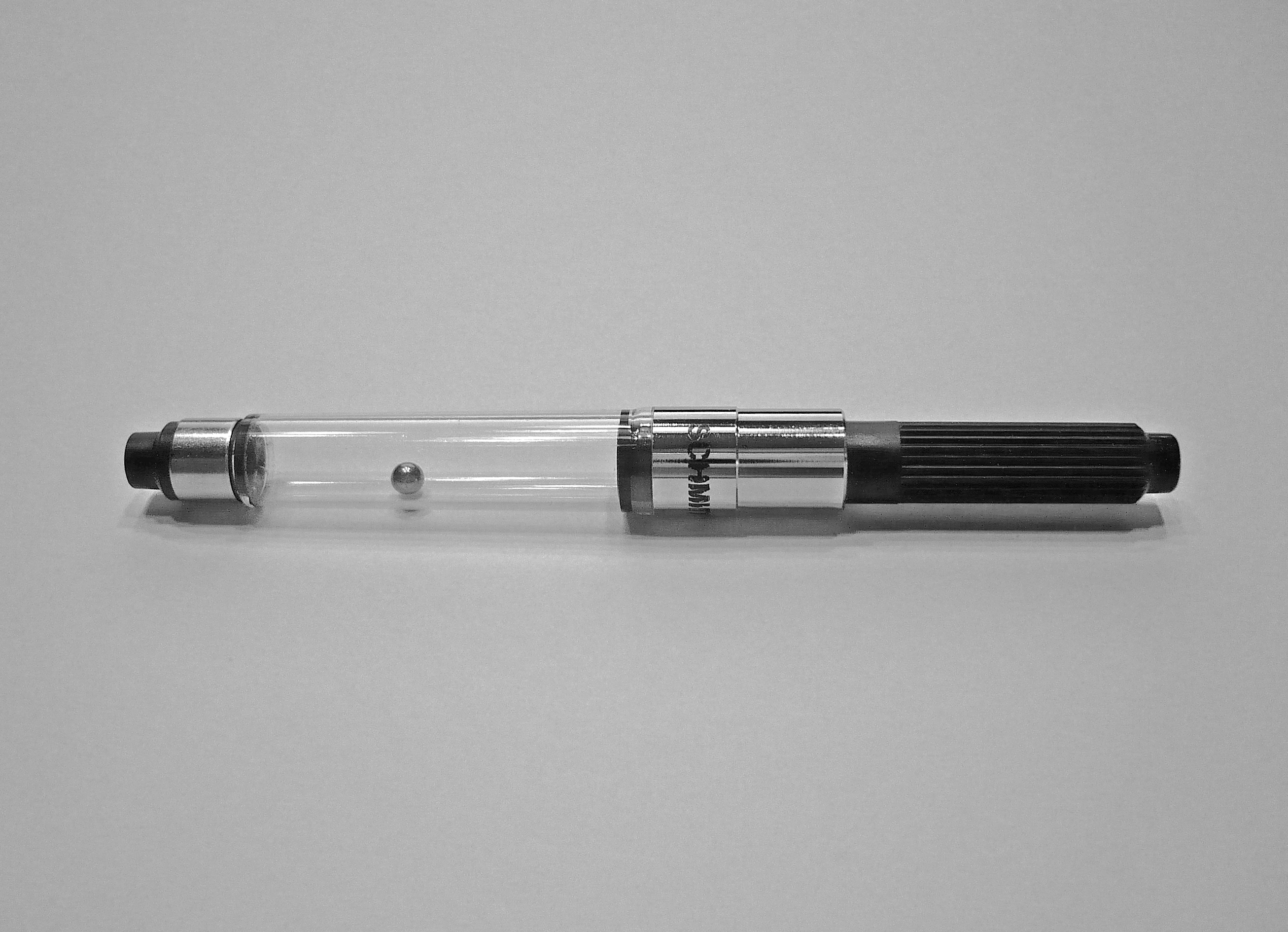
A fountain pen converter containing a 316 stainless ball of 2.5 mm diameter

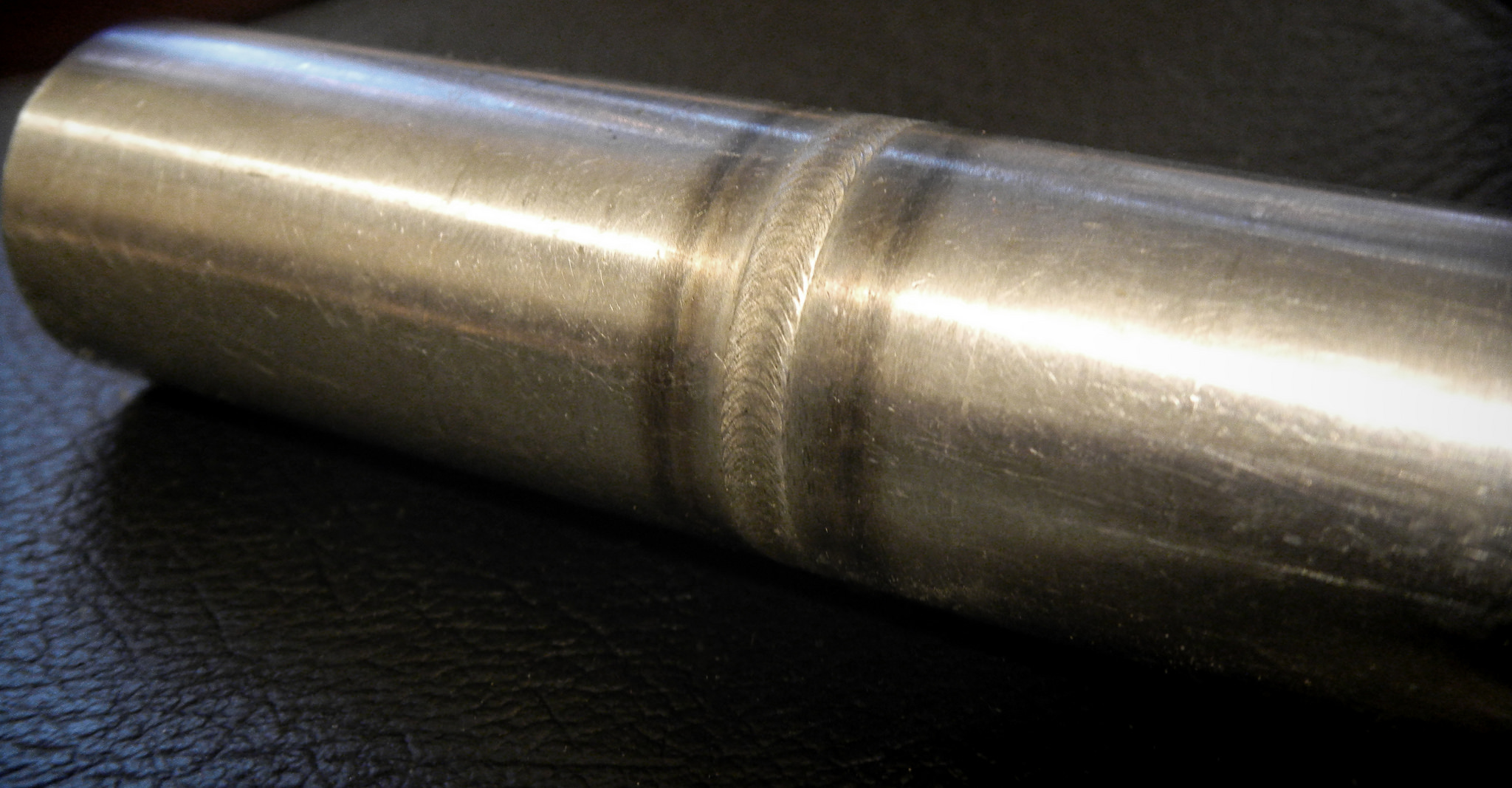
Two welded 316L steel pipes.

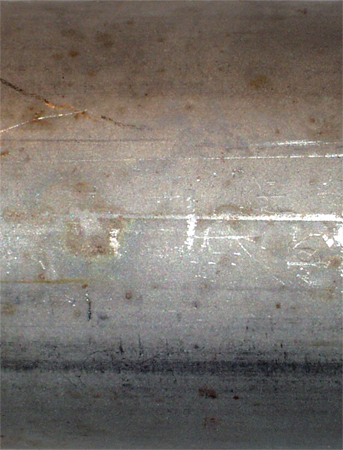
Unpolished 316L steel.

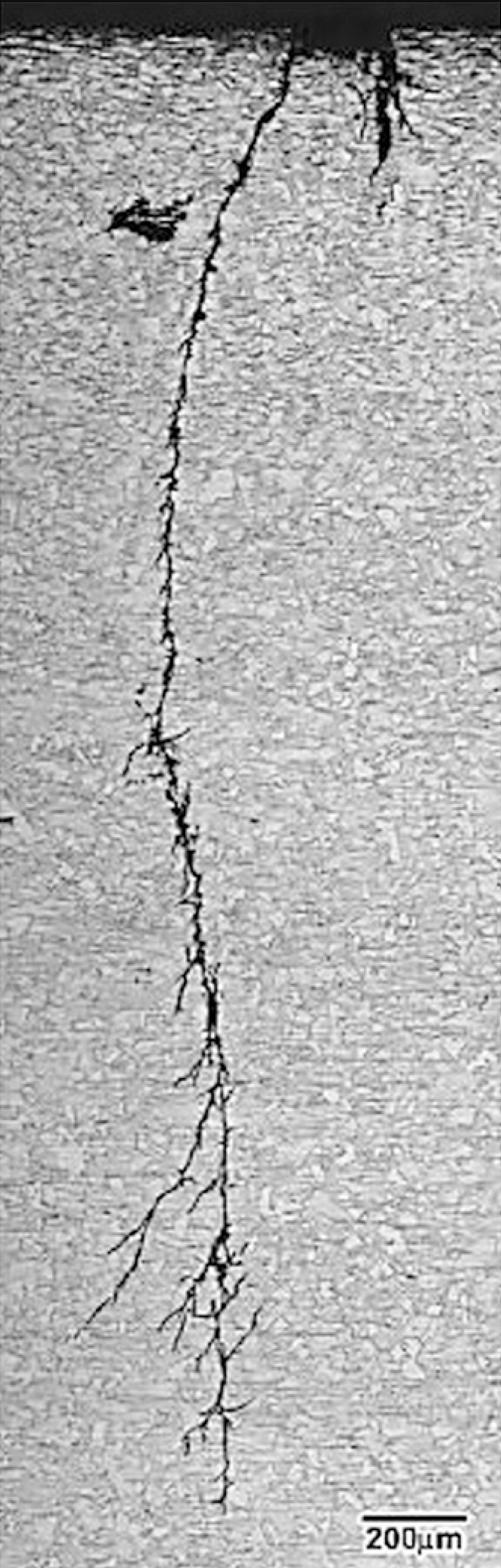
Stress corrosion cracking in 316L by synthetic seawater

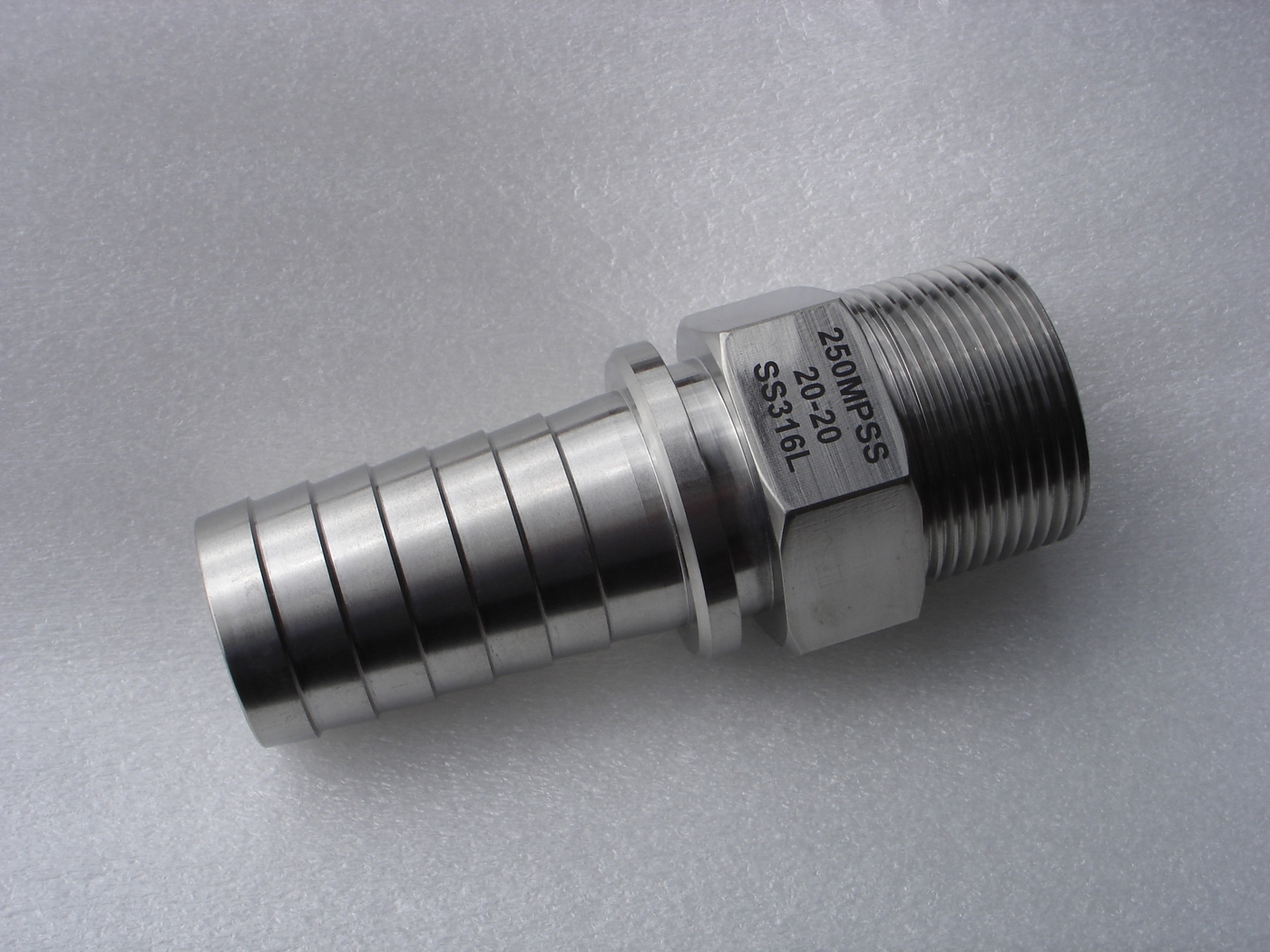
Hose barb pipe fitting in 316L

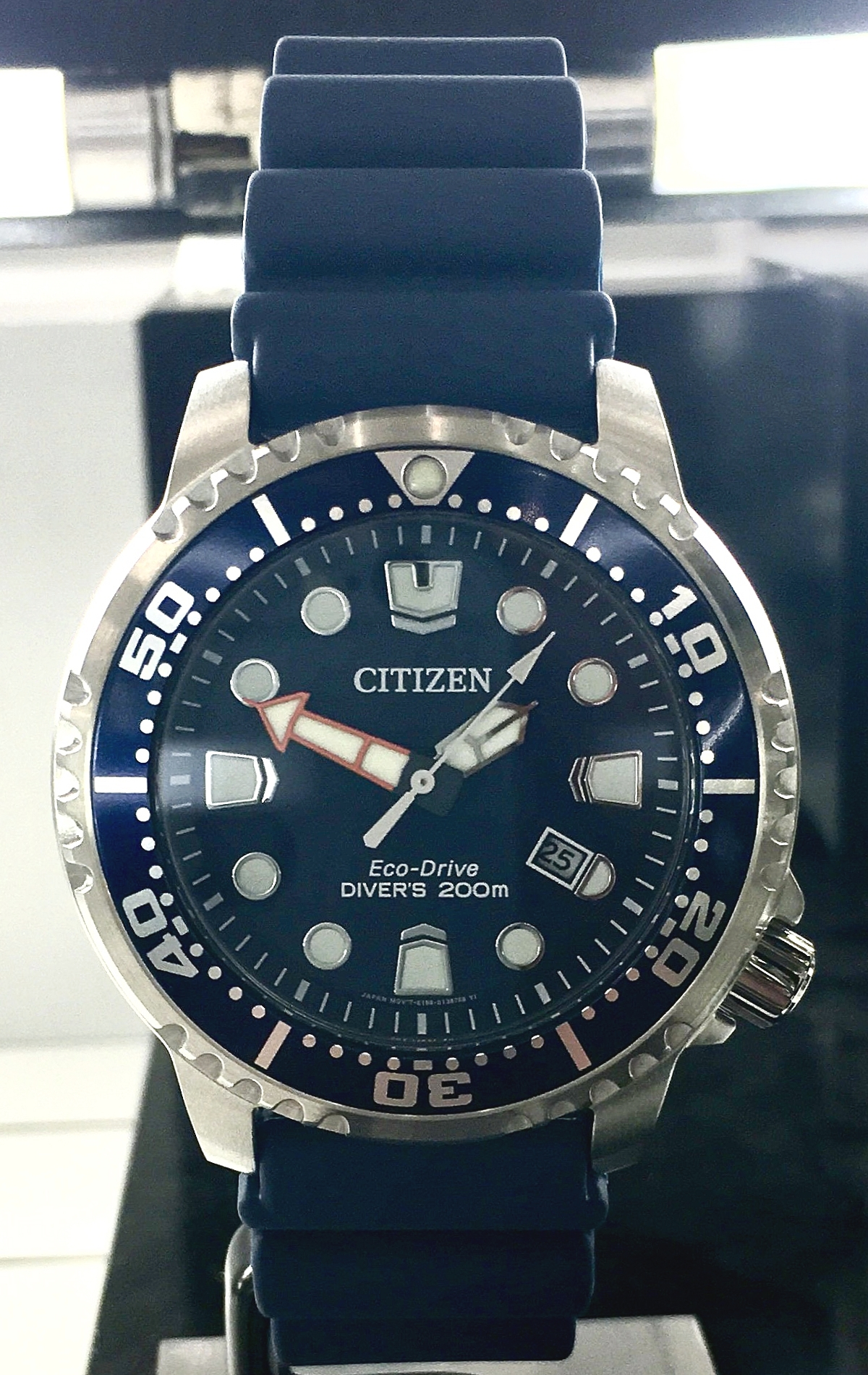
Citizen watch in 316L on a rubber strap

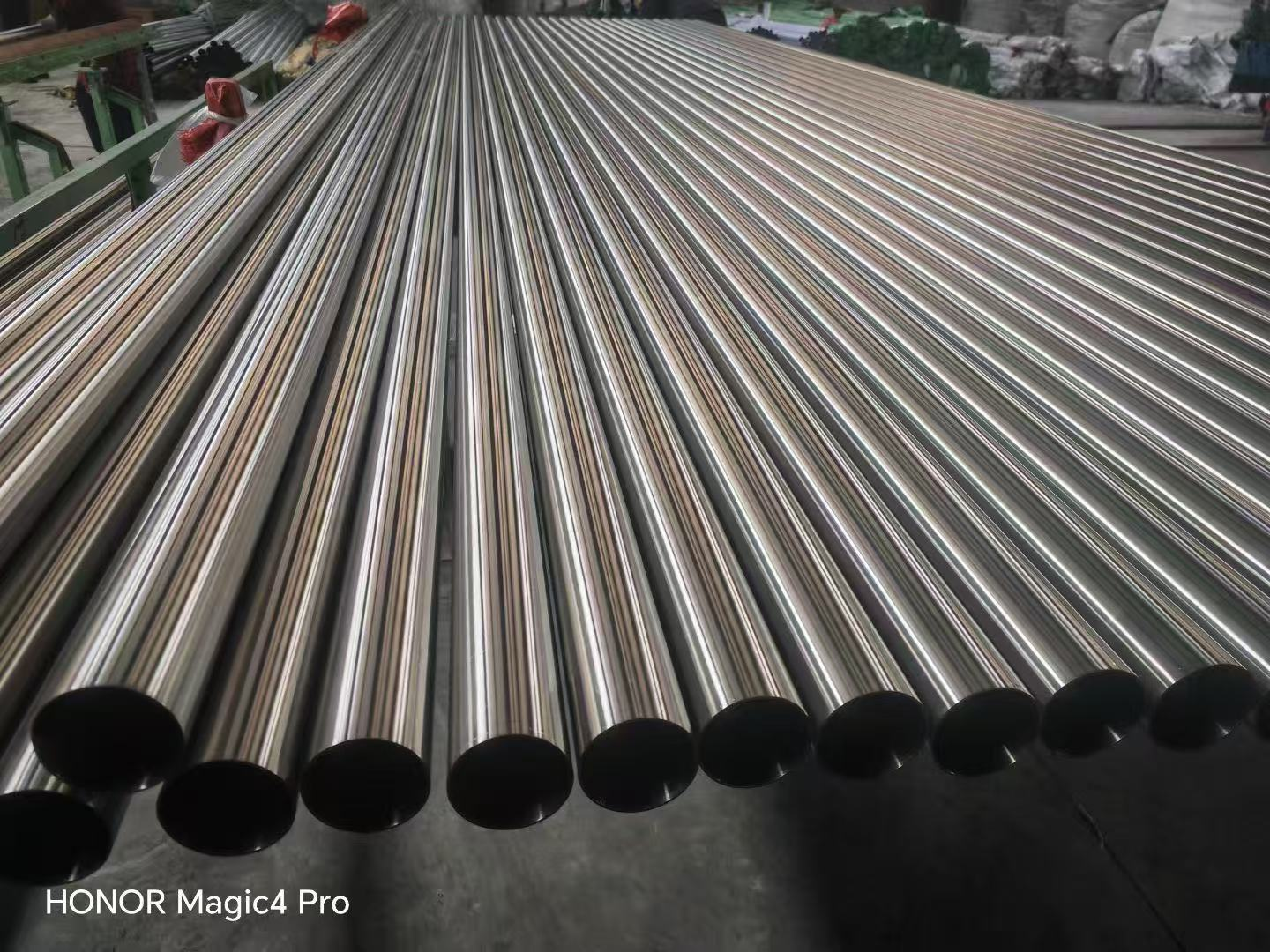
Stainless steel pipe

== See also ==
- SAF 2205
