= Austenitic stainless steel =

One of the five families of stainless steel

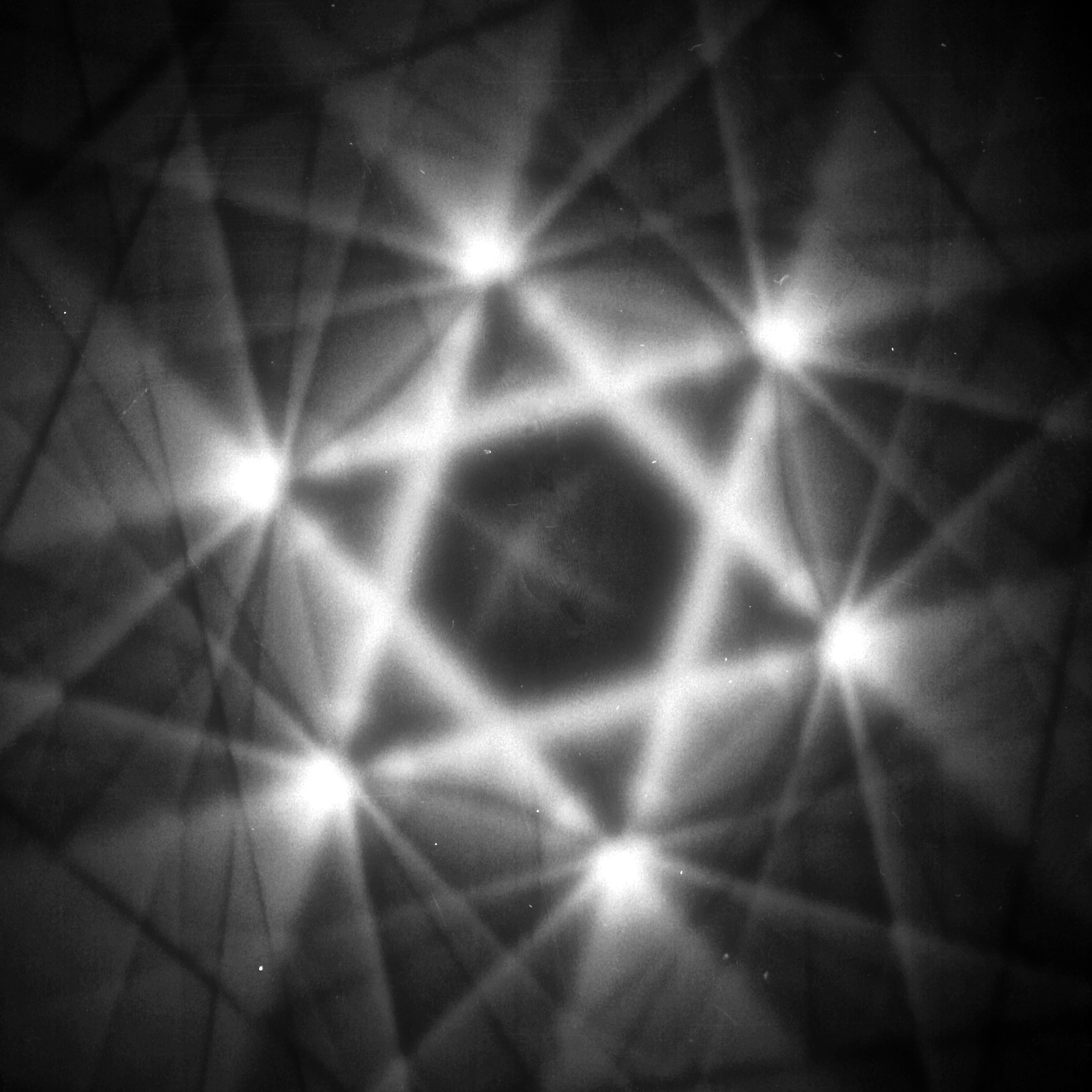
Convergent beam electron diffraction (CBED) transmission electron micrograph of a [111] zone axis of austenitic stainless steel

Austenitic stainless steel is one of the five families of stainless steel (along with ferritic, martensitic, duplex and precipitation hardened). Its primary crystalline structure is austenite (face-centered cubic). Such steels are not hardenable by heat treatment and are essentially non-magnetic. This structure is achieved by adding enough austenite-stabilizing elements such as nickel, manganese and nitrogen. The Incoloy family of alloys belong to the category of super austenitic stainless steels. Corrosion resistance is provided by the large percentage of alloyed chromium, the inclusion of which imparts a protective Cr_{2}O_{3} layer on the exposed surface when chromium reacts with atmospheric oxygen.

== History ==
Schaeffler diagram

During World War II, the Schaeffler diagram was invented by Anton Schaeffler, who was then a budding metallurgist in the employ of two American welding electrode manufacturers, Harnischfeger Company and A.O. Smith Corporation.

== AISI 200 and 300 series ==
Austenitic stainless steels are divided into 300-series and 200-series subgroups. In 300 series stainless steels, the austenitic structure is obtained primarily by adding nickel. The structure in 200 series stainless steels, however, is obtained by adding manganese and nitrogen, with a small amount of nickel content. This makes 200 series steels a cost-effective nickel-chromium austenitic type stainless steel.

300 series stainless steels are the larger subgroup. The most common austenitic stainless steel and most common of all stainless steel is Type 304, also known as 18/8 or A2. Type 304 is extensively used in such items as cookware, cutlery, and kitchen equipment. Type 316, also known as A4, is the next most common austenitic stainless steel. Some 300 series, such as Type 316, also contain some molybdenum to promote resistance to acids and increase resistance to localized attack (e.g. pitting and crevice corrosion).

Average content by weight (%) of the major alloying elements of most common Cr–Ni austenitic stainless steel grades
Euronorm (EN) number	EN designation	AISI grade	UNS Designation	C	Cr	Mo	Ni	Others	Melts at	Remark
1.4372	X12CrMnNiN17-7-5	201	S20100	<0.15	16.0-18.0	NS	3.50-5.50	Mn: 5.50-7.50		
1.4373	X12CrMnNiN18-9-5	202	S20200	<0.15	17.0-19.0	NS	4.0-6.0	Mn: 7.50-10.00		
1.4310	X10CrNi18-8	301	S30100	0.10	17.5	NS	8	NS	1420	For springs
1.4301	X5CrNi18-10	304	S30400	< 0.07	18.5	NS	9	NS	1450	A very common austenitic stainless steel grade
1.4307	X2CrNi18-9	304L	S30403	< 0.030	18.5	NS	9	NS	1450	Similar to the above but not susceptible to intergranular corrosion thanks to a lower C content.
1.4305	X8CrNiS18-9 ^{e}	303		< 0.10	18	NS	9	0.3	1420	Sulphur is added to improve machinability.
1.4541	X6CrNiTi18-10	321	S32100	< 0.08	18	NS	10.5	Ti: 5×C ≤ 0.70	1425	Same as grade 1.4301 but not susceptible to intergranular corrosion thanks to Ti which "traps" C.
1.4401	X5CrNiMo17-12-2	316	S31600	< 0.07	17.5	2.2	11.5	NS	1400	Second best known austenitic grade. Mo increases the corrosion resistance.
1.4404	X2CrNiMo17-12-2	316L	S31603	< 0.030	17.5	2.25	11.5	NS	1400	Same as above but not susceptible to intergranular corrosion thanks to a lower C content.
1.4571	X6CrNiMoTi17-12-2	316Ti	S31635	< 0.08	17.5	2.25	12	Ti: 5×C ≤ 0.70		

The higher nitrogen addition in 200 series gives them higher mechanical strength than 300 series.

Alloy 20 (Carpenter 20) is an austenitic stainless steel possessing excellent resistance to hot sulfuric acid and many other aggressive environments which would readily attack type 316 stainless. This alloy exhibits superior resistance to stress-corrosion cracking in boiling 20–40% sulfuric acid. Alloy 20 has excellent mechanical properties and the presence of niobium in the alloy minimizes the precipitation of carbides during welding.

== Heat resisting austenitic stainless steels ==
Heat resisting grades can be used at elevated temperatures, usually above 600 °C (1100 °F).

They must resist corrosion (usually oxidation) and retain mechanical properties, mostly strength (yield stress) and creep resistance.

Corrosion resistance is mostly provided by chromium, with additions of silicon and aluminium. Nickel does not resist well in sulphur containing environments. This is usually taken care of by adding more Si and Al which form very stable oxides. Rare earth elements such as cerium increase the stability of the oxide film.

Typical composition of the major grades
EN	EN designation	AISI/ASTM	UNS	C	Cr	Ni	Si	Mn	Others
1.4878	X8CrNiTi18-10	321H	S32109	< 0.1	18	10.5	–	–	Ti: ≤ 5×C
1.4818	X6CrNiSiNCe19-10	–	S30415	0.06	19	10	–	–	N: 0.16; Ce: 0.05.
1.4828	X15CrNiSi20-12	309	–	< 0.2	20	12	2.0	–	–
1.4833	X12CrNi23-13	309S	S30908	< 0.08	23	13	< 0.75	–	–
1.4872	X25CrMnNiN25-9-7	–	–	0.25	25	7	–	9	–
1.4845	X15CrNi25-21	310S	S31008	< 0.1	25	20	–	–	–
1.4841	X15CrNiSi25-21	314	S31400	< 0.15	25	20	1.8	–	–
1.4876	X10NiCrAITi32-20	"Alloy 800"	N08800	< 0.12	21	32	–	–	Al: 0.4; Ti: 0.4
1.4854	X6NiCrSiNCe35-25	"Alloy 353MA"	S35315	0.06	25	35	–	–	N: 0.15; Ce: 0.06.
1.4886	X12NiCrSi35-16	330	N08330	< 0.15	18.5	35	–		–

Type 309 and 310 are used in high temperature applications greater than 800 °C (1500 °F).

Note: ferritic stainless steels do not retain strength at elevated temperatures and are not used when strength is required.

Austenitic stainless steel can be tested by nondestructive testing using the dye penetrant inspection method but not the magnetic particle inspection method. Eddy-current testing may also be used.

== Precipitation Hardening grade EN 1.4980 ==
Grade EN 1.4980 (also known as A286) is not considered strictly as a heat resisting steel in standards, but this is popular grade for its combination of strength and corrosion resistance.

Typical composition
EN No.	EN designation	AISI/ASTM	UNS	C	Cr	Ni	Mo	Others
1.4980	X6NiCrTiMoVB25-15-2	660	S66286	0.05	15	25	1.25	V: 0.3; Ti: 2.0; B: 0.006.

Minimum mechanical properties
Condition	Yield stress, min	Ultimate tensile strength, min	Elongation, min (%)
Solution treated and aged	590 MPa (86 ksi)	900 MPa (130 ksi)	13

It is used for service temperatures up to 700 °C (1300 °F) in applications such as:

- Aerospace (standardized in AMS 5731, AMS 5732, AMS 5737 and AMS 5525 standards),
- Industrial gas turbines,
- Automotive (turbo parts), etc.

== Thermomechanical Properties of Austenitic Stainless Steel ==
The face centered cubic (FCC) microstructure of austenitic stainless steel is enabled by the inclusion of nickel (cite). Under normal atmospheric conditions, the crystal structure of iron is body centered cubic (BCC), also known as alpha-iron or ferrite. Above approximately 910 °C (1183 K), the crystal structure changes to FCC gamma-iron, or austenite. By contrast, nickel maintains a FCC crystal structure regardless of temperature. Thus, the alloying of nickel during the smelting process of stainless steel forces the crystal structure of the metal to remain in the FCC configuration as the metal cools. This stabilization remains at all temperatures, thus austenitic steels cannot be heat hardened, as they retain the same crystal structure up until the solidus temperature.

A key part of austenitic stainless steel production is decarburization, the removal of most carbon from the alloy. Due to its open FCC structure, austenite dissolves carbon very easily, causing it to accumulate within the metal during cooling. Carbon atoms readily produce carbides from alloyed chromium, forming as precipitates within the metal. While precipitates are desirable for strengthening of some steels due to their ability to obstruct dislocations (crystal latice defects) and force climb instead of glide, the formation of carbides can leech chromium from the Cr_{2}O_{3} coating of the metal. This weakens the protective film, a process that then compounds as the reduced protection permits corrosion to cause further damage. The formation of damaging carbides can be discouraged via the addition of elements that favor carbide formation such as titanium or niobium, as these will bond with carbon rather than chromium.

The FCC structure of austenite confers ductility to stainless steel, as the slip planes permit dislocations to move easily via the glide mechanism. When worked at cold temperatures or subjected to mechanical stresses beyond the yield point, austenitic steels will work harden, as dislocations formed within the crystal structure compound upon one another. Additionally, misalignment of crystalline structures results in the formation of body-centered tetragonal (BCT) martensite, a significantly harder crystal structure of steel. The misalignment of the differing crystal structures will harden the metal further, as dislocations are unable to pass through the high strain area of the material. While this increases tensile strength, the material thus worked will lose much of its ductility, becoming brittle and susceptible to rapid failure if the ultimate yield strength is exceeded. The material may be returned to its original austenitic FCC structure via solution heat treatment, allowing dynamic recrystallization of the structure to release the strain present in BCT grains and the reformation of FCC structures.

Under long term stress, austenitic stainless steels are subject to creep, or slow deformation over time as dislocations move through the crystal structure. The deformation mechanisms occurring are dependent on both applied stress as well as temperature. An example of this process may be seen in the deformation map below for Alloy 316, a commonly used austenitic stainless steel.

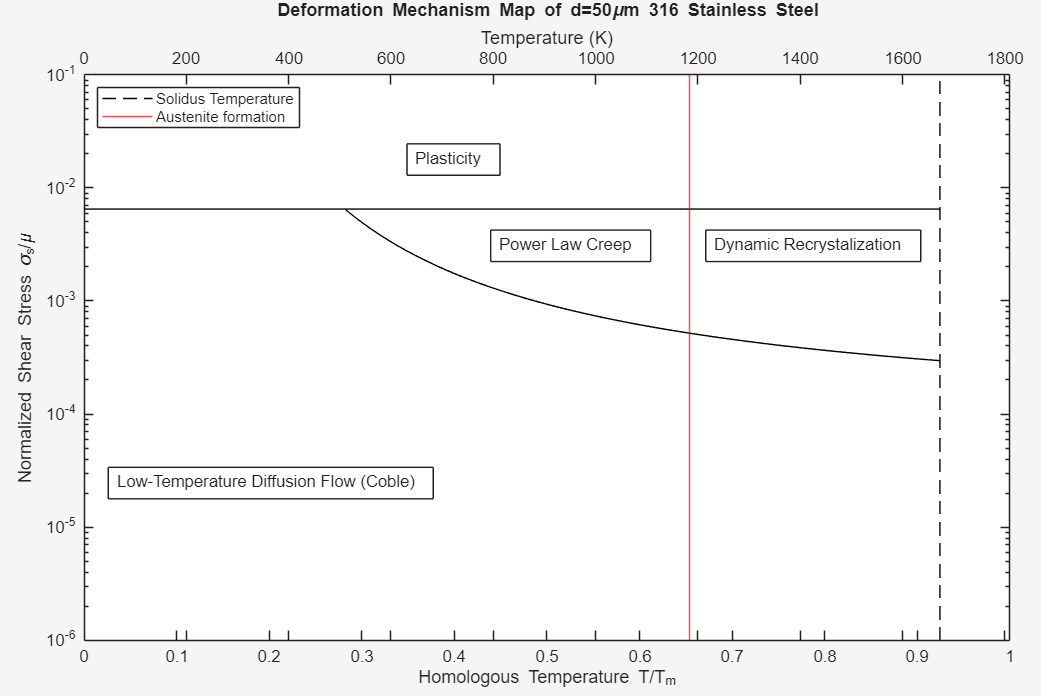

Even at low temperatures, long term application of stress can cause the movement of dislocations via diffusion. Above temperatures of approximately 480 °C (753 K), deformation becomes plastic as power-law creep occurs, with glide becoming predominant. The transition to climb-plus-glide power law creep is however not distinct, due to the temperature at which austenite forms; at this point, dynamic recrystallization of the metal begins, and creep of the material will accelerate as the steel rapidly becomes more malleable. As a result, these steels are usually not recommended for use above 700 °C for structural purposes, and 870 °C (1143 K) is usually considered the upper practical limit for high-temperature austenitic steels Maximum service temperatures in air for stainless steels – British Stainless Steel Association.

As the material approaches melting temperature, the crystalline structure begins to transition to a disordered liquid form. This temperature is known as the solidus/liquidus temperature, where the material is part solid, part molten. Alloy 316 has a liquidus temperature of approximately 1375 °C, and fully melts at approximately 1400 °C.

== See also ==
- Stainless steel
  - Duplex stainless steel – Stainless steel that has both austenitic and ferritic phases
  - Ferritic stainless steel – High chromium, low carbon stainless steel type
  - Martensitic stainless steel – One of the five families of stainless steel
