= PREN =

PREN may refer to:

- Pitting resistance equivalent number, a measurement of the corrosion resistance of stainless steel containing nickel
- Partido RENovador (Spanish for Renewal Party), a former Panamanian right liberal political party
