= Filiform =

Filiform, thread or filament like, can refer to:

- Filiform, a common term used in botany to describe a thread-like shape
- Filiform, or filiform catheter, a medical device whose component parts or segments are all cylindrical and more or less uniform in size
- Filiform papilla on the tongue
- Insect antennae shape
- Thread-like crystal formations
- A corrosion mechanism
