= Corrosion =

Gradual destruction of materials by chemical reaction with its environment

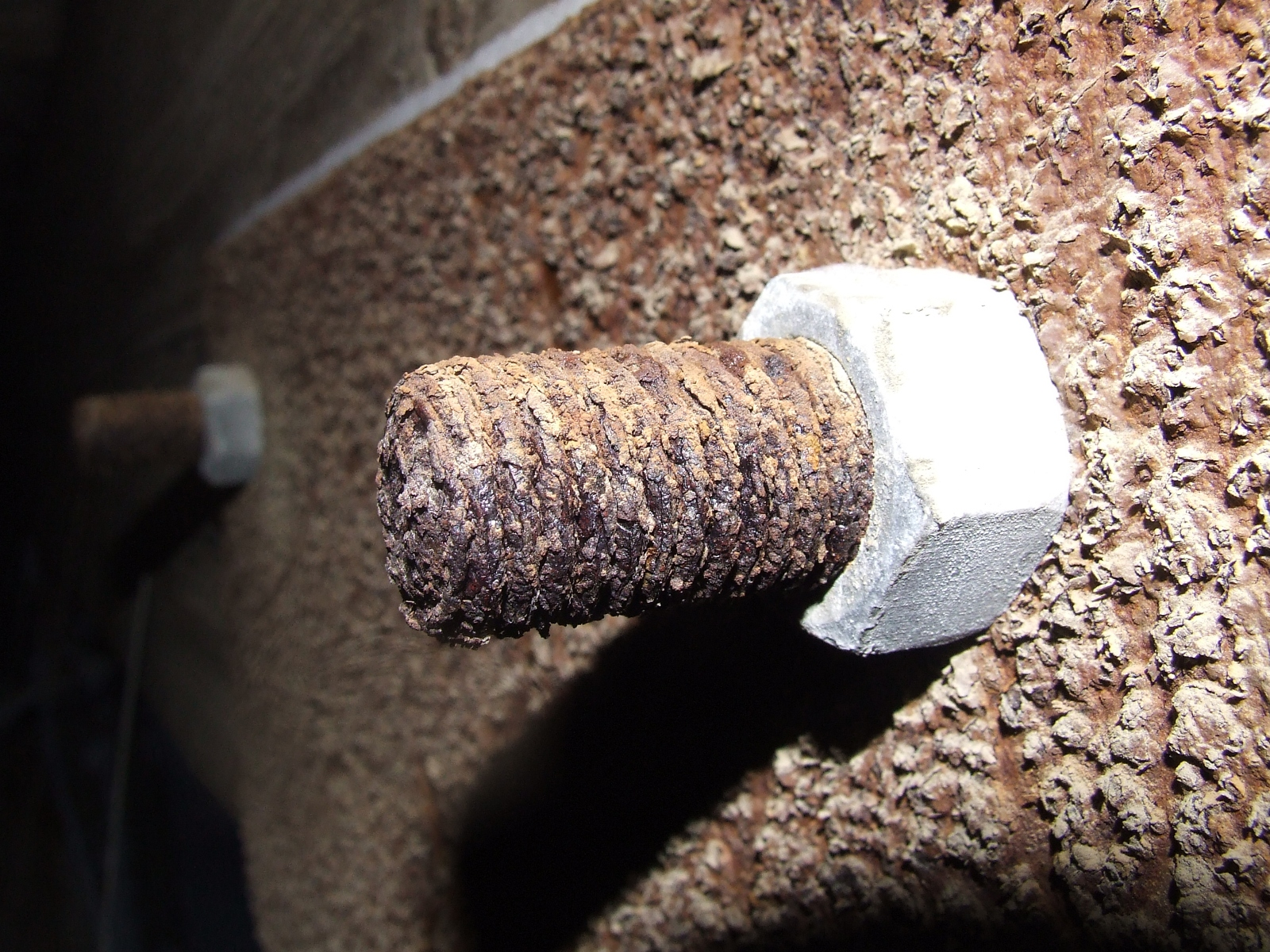
Corrosion on exposed metal, including a bolt and nut

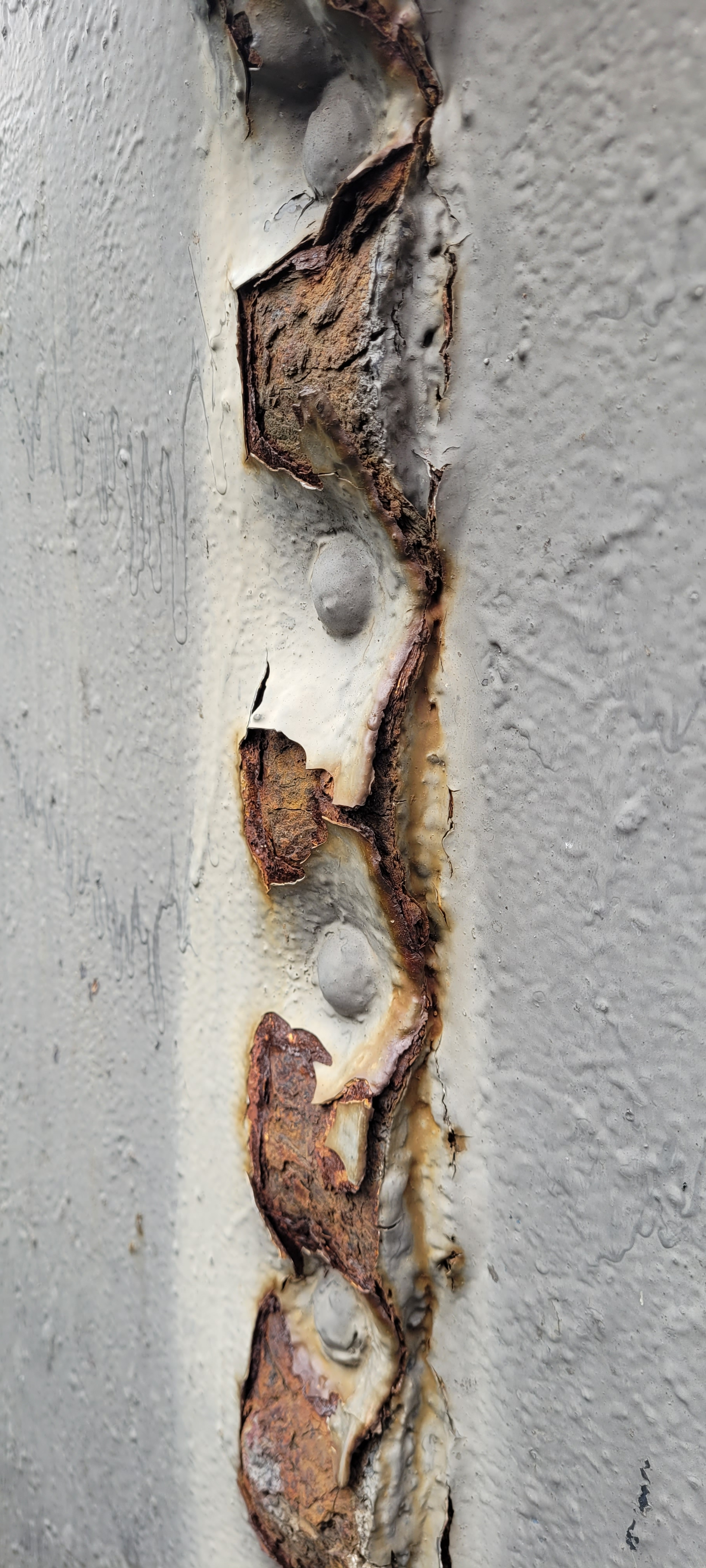
Riveted connection of elements of the cooling tower of a power plant from 1904. Increased material volume caused by corrosion.

Corrosion is a natural process that converts a refined metal into a more chemically stable oxide. It is the gradual deterioration of materials (usually a metal) by chemical or electrochemical reaction with their environment. Corrosion engineering is the field dedicated to controlling and preventing corrosion.

In the most common use of the word, this means electrochemical oxidation of a metal reacting with an oxidant such as oxygen (O_{2}, gaseous or dissolved), or H_{3}O^{+} ions ( H^{+}, hydrated protons) present in aqueous solution. Rusting, the formation of red-orange iron oxides, is perhaps the most familiar example of electrochemical corrosion. This type of corrosion typically produces oxides or salts of the original metal and results in a distinctive coloration. Corrosion can also occur in materials other than metals, such as ceramics or polymers, although, in this context, the term degradation is more common. Corrosion degrades the useful properties of materials and structures including mechanical strength, appearance, and permeability to liquids and gases.

Many structural alloys corrode merely from exposure to moisture in air, but the process can be strongly affected by exposure to certain substances. Corrosion can be concentrated locally to form a pit or crack, or it can extend across a wide area, more or less uniformly corroding the surface. Because corrosion is a diffusion-controlled process, it occurs on exposed surfaces. As a result, methods to reduce the activity of the exposed surface, such as passivation and chromate conversion, can increase a material's corrosion resistance. However, some corrosion mechanisms are less visible and less predictable.

The chemistry of corrosion is complex; it can be considered an electrochemical phenomenon. During corrosion at a particular spot on the surface of an object made of iron, oxidation takes place and that spot behaves as an anode. The electrons released at this anodic spot move through the metal to another spot on the object and reduce oxygen at that spot in the presence of hydrogen ions (H^{+}, which are believed to be available from carbonic acid (H_{2}CO_{3}) formed by dissolution of atmospheric carbon dioxide or other acidic oxides in the presence of water vapor. This spot then behaves as a cathode.

== Galvanic corrosion ==
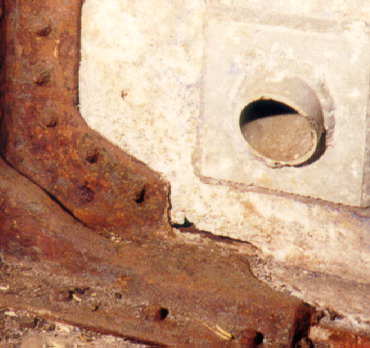
Galvanic corrosion of an aluminium plate occurred when the plate was connected to a mild steel structural support.

Galvanic corrosion occurs when two different metals have physical or electrical contact with each other and are immersed in a common electrolyte, or when the same metal is exposed to electrolyte with different concentrations. In a galvanic couple, the more active metal (the anode) corrodes at an accelerated rate and the more noble metal (the cathode) corrodes at a slower rate. When immersed separately, each metal corrodes at its own rate. What type of metal(s) to use is readily determined by following the galvanic series. For example, zinc is often used as a sacrificial anode for steel structures. Galvanic corrosion is of major interest to the marine industry and also anywhere water (containing salts) contacts pipes or metal structures.

Factors such as relative size of anode, types of metal, and operating conditions (temperature, humidity, salinity, etc.) affect galvanic corrosion. The surface area ratio of the anode and cathode directly affects the corrosion rates of the materials. Galvanic corrosion is often prevented by the use of sacrificial anodes.

=== Galvanic series ===
In any given environment (one standard medium is aerated, room-temperature seawater), one metal will be either more noble or more active than others, based on how strongly its ions are bound to the surface. Two metals in electrical contact share the same electrons, so that the "tug-of-war" at each surface is analogous to competition for free electrons between the two materials. Using the electrolyte as a host for the flow of ions in the same direction, the noble metal will take electrons from the active one. The resulting mass flow or electric current can be measured to establish a hierarchy of materials in the medium of interest. This hierarchy is called a galvanic series and is useful in predicting and understanding corrosion.

== Corrosion removal ==
Often, it is possible to chemically remove the products of corrosion. For example, phosphoric acid in the form of naval jelly is often applied to ferrous tools or surfaces to remove rust. Corrosion removal should not be confused with electropolishing, which removes some layers of the underlying metal to make a smooth surface. For example, phosphoric acid may also be used to electropolish copper but it does this by removing copper, not the products of copper corrosion.

== Resistance to corrosion ==
Some metals are more intrinsically resistant to corrosion than others (for some examples, see galvanic series). There are various ways of protecting metals from corrosion (oxidation) including painting, hot-dip galvanization, cathodic protection, and combinations of these.

=== Intrinsic chemistry ===
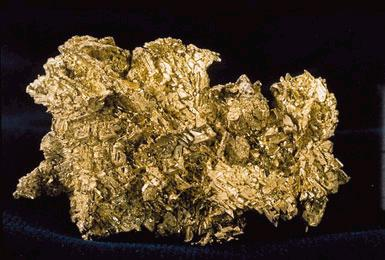
Gold nuggets do not naturally corrode, even on a geological time scale.

The materials most resistant to corrosion are those for which corrosion is thermodynamically unfavorable. Any corrosion products of gold or platinum tend to decompose spontaneously into pure metal, which is why these elements can be found in metallic form on Earth and have long been valued. More common "base" metals can only be protected by more temporary means.

Some metals have naturally slow reaction kinetics, even though their corrosion is thermodynamically favorable. These include such metals as zinc, magnesium, and cadmium. While corrosion of these metals is continuous and ongoing, it happens at an acceptably slow rate. An extreme example is graphite, which releases large amounts of energy upon oxidation, but has such slow kinetics that it is effectively immune to electrochemical corrosion under normal conditions.

=== Passivation ===
Passivation refers to the spontaneous formation of an ultrathin film of corrosion products, known as a passive film, on the metal's surface that act as a barrier to further oxidation. The chemical composition and microstructure of a passive film are different from the underlying metal. Typical passive film thickness on aluminium, stainless steels, and alloys is within 10 nanometers. The passive film is different from oxide layers that are formed upon heating and are in the micrometer thickness range – the passive film recovers if removed or damaged whereas the oxide layer does not. Passivation in natural environments such as air, water and soil at moderate pH is seen in such materials as aluminium, stainless steel, titanium, and silicon.

Passivation is primarily determined by metallurgical and environmental factors. The effect of pH is summarized using Pourbaix diagrams, but many other factors are influential. Some conditions that inhibit passivation include high pH for aluminium and zinc, low pH or the presence of chloride ions for stainless steel, high temperature for titanium (in which case the oxide dissolves into the metal, rather than the electrolyte) and fluoride ions for silicon. On the other hand, unusual conditions may result in passivation of materials that are normally unprotected, as the alkaline environment of concrete does for steel rebar. Exposure to a liquid metal such as mercury or hot solder can often circumvent passivation mechanisms.

It has been shown using electrochemical scanning tunneling microscopy that during iron passivation, an n-type semiconductor Fe(III) oxide grows at the interface with the metal that leads to the buildup of an electronic barrier opposing electron flow and an electronic depletion region that prevents further oxidation reactions. These results indicate a mechanism of "electronic passivation". The electronic properties of this semiconducting oxide film also provide a mechanistic explanation of corrosion mediated by chloride, which creates surface states at the oxide surface that lead to electronic breakthrough, restoration of anodic currents, and disruption of the electronic passivation mechanism.

== Corrosion in passivated materials ==
Passivation is extremely useful in mitigating corrosion damage, however even a high-quality alloy will corrode if its ability to form a passivating film is hindered. Proper selection of the right grade of material for the specific environment is important for the long-lasting performance of this group of materials. If breakdown occurs in the passive film due to chemical or mechanical factors, the resulting major modes of corrosion may include pitting corrosion, crevice corrosion, and stress corrosion cracking.

=== Pitting corrosion ===
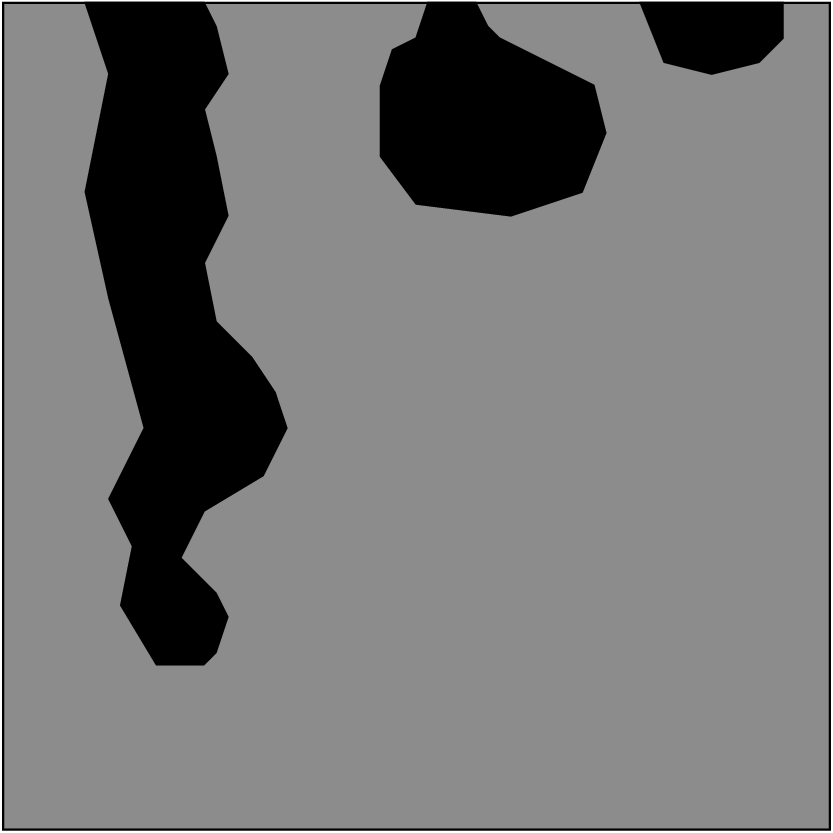
Diagram showing cross-section of pitting corrosion

Certain conditions, such as low concentrations of oxygen or high concentrations of species such as chloride which compete as anions, can interfere with a given alloy's ability to re-form a passivating film. In the worst case, almost all of the surface will remain protected, but tiny local fluctuations will degrade the oxide film in a few critical points. Corrosion at these points will be greatly amplified, and can cause corrosion pits of several types, depending upon conditions. While the corrosion pits only nucleate under fairly extreme circumstances, they can continue to grow even when conditions return to normal, since the interior of a pit is naturally deprived of oxygen and locally the pH decreases to very low values and the corrosion rate increases due to an autocatalytic process. In extreme cases, the sharp tips of extremely long and narrow corrosion pits can cause stress concentration to the point that otherwise tough alloys can shatter; a thin film pierced by an invisibly small hole can hide a thumb sized pit from view. These problems are especially dangerous because they are difficult to detect before a part or structure fails. Pitting remains among the most common and damaging forms of corrosion in passivated alloys, but it can be prevented by control of the alloy's environment.

Pitting results when a small hole, or cavity, forms in the metal, usually as a result of de-passivation of a small area. This area becomes anodic, while part of the remaining metal becomes cathodic, producing a localized galvanic reaction. The deterioration of this small area penetrates the metal and can lead to failure. This form of corrosion is often difficult to detect because it is usually relatively small and may be covered and hidden by corrosion-produced compounds.

=== Weld decay and knifeline attack ===
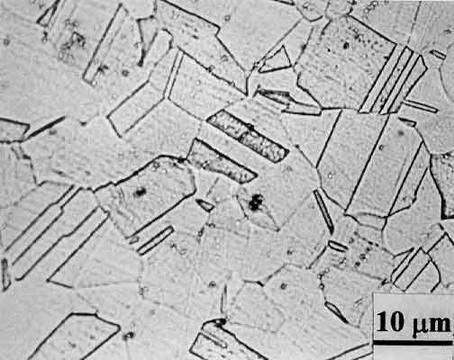
Normal microstructure of Type 304 stainless steel surface

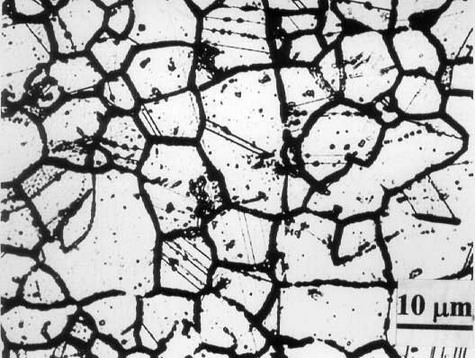
Sensitized metallic microstructure, showing wider intergranular boundaries

Stainless steel can pose special corrosion challenges, since its passivating behavior relies on the presence of a major alloying component (chromium, at least 11.5%). Because of the elevated temperatures of welding and heat treatment, chromium carbides can form in the grain boundaries of stainless alloys. This chemical reaction robs the material of chromium in the zone near the grain boundary, making those areas much less resistant to corrosion. This creates a galvanic couple with the well-protected alloy nearby, which leads to "weld decay" (corrosion of the grain boundaries in the heat affected zones) in highly corrosive environments. This process can seriously reduce the mechanical strength of welded joints over time.

A stainless steel is said to be "sensitized" if chromium carbides are formed in the microstructure. A typical microstructure of a normalized type 304 stainless steel shows no signs of sensitization, while a heavily sensitized steel shows the presence of grain boundary precipitates. The dark lines in the sensitized microstructure are networks of chromium carbides formed along the grain boundaries.

Special alloys, either with low carbon content or with added carbon "getters" such as titanium and niobium (in types 321 and 347, respectively), can prevent this effect, but the latter require special heat treatment after welding to prevent the similar phenomenon of "knifeline attack". As its name implies, corrosion is limited to a very narrow zone adjacent to the weld, often only a few micrometers across, making it even less noticeable.

=== Crevice corrosion ===
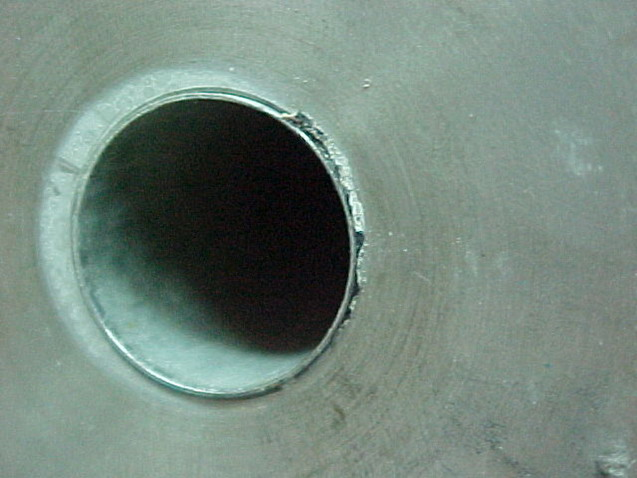
Corrosion in the crevice between the tube and tube sheet (both made of type 316 stainless steel) of a heat exchanger in a seawater desalination plant

Crevice corrosion is a localized form of corrosion occurring in confined spaces (crevices), to which the access of the working fluid from the environment is limited. Formation of a differential aeration cell leads to corrosion inside the crevices. Examples of crevices are gaps and contact areas between parts, under gaskets or seals, inside cracks and seams, spaces filled with deposits, and under sludge piles.

Crevice corrosion is influenced by the crevice type (metal-metal, metal-non-metal), crevice geometry (size, surface finish), and metallurgical and environmental factors. The susceptibility to crevice corrosion can be evaluated with ASTM standard procedures. A critical crevice corrosion temperature is commonly used to rank a material's resistance to crevice corrosion.

=== Hydrogen grooving ===
In the chemical industry, hydrogen grooving is the corrosion of piping at grooves created by the interaction of a corrosive agent, corroded pipe constituents, and hydrogen gas bubbles. For example, when sulfuric acid (H_{2}SO_{4}) flows through steel pipes, the iron in the steel reacts with the acid to form a passivation coating of iron sulfate (FeSO_{4}) and hydrogen gas (H_{2}). The iron sulfate coating will protect the steel from further reaction; however, if hydrogen bubbles contact this coating, it will be removed. Thus, a groove can be formed by a travelling bubble, exposing more steel to the acid, causing a vicious cycle. The grooving is exacerbated by the tendency of subsequent bubbles to follow the same path.

== High-temperature corrosion ==
High-temperature corrosion is chemical deterioration of a material (typically a metal) as a result of heating. This non-galvanic form of corrosion can occur when a metal is subjected to a hot atmosphere containing oxygen, sulfur ("sulfidation"), or other compounds capable of oxidizing (or assisting the oxidation of) the material concerned. For example, materials used in aerospace, power generation, and even in car engines must resist sustained periods at high temperature, during which they may be exposed to an atmosphere containing the potentially highly-corrosive products of combustion.

Some products of high-temperature corrosion can potentially be turned to the advantage of the engineer. The formation of oxides on stainless steels, for example, can provide a protective layer preventing further atmospheric attack, allowing for a material to be used for sustained periods at both room and high temperatures in hostile conditions. Such high-temperature corrosion products, in the form of compacted oxide layer glazes, prevent or reduce wear during high-temperature sliding contact of metallic (or metallic and ceramic) surfaces. Thermal oxidation is also commonly used to produce controlled oxide nanostructures, including nanowires and thin films.

== Microbial corrosion ==
Microbial corrosion, or commonly known as microbiologically influenced corrosion (MIC), is a corrosion caused or promoted by microorganisms, usually chemoautotrophs. It can apply to both metallic and non-metallic materials, in the presence or absence of oxygen. Sulfate-reducing bacteria are active in the absence of oxygen (anaerobic); they produce hydrogen sulfide, causing sulfide stress cracking. In the presence of oxygen (aerobic), some bacteria may directly oxidize iron to iron oxides and hydroxides, other bacteria oxidize sulfur and produce sulfuric acid causing biogenic sulfide corrosion. Concentration cells can form in the deposits of corrosion products, leading to localized corrosion.

Accelerated low-water corrosion (ALWC) is a particularly aggressive form of MIC that affects steel piles in seawater near the low water tide mark. It is characterized by an orange sludge, which smells of hydrogen sulfide when treated with acid. Corrosion rates can be very high and design corrosion allowances can soon be exceeded leading to premature failure of the steel pile. Piles that have been coated and have cathodic protection installed at the time of construction are not susceptible to ALWC. For unprotected piles, sacrificial anodes can be installed locally to the affected areas to inhibit the corrosion or a complete retrofitted sacrificial anode system can be installed. Affected areas can also be treated using cathodic protection, using either sacrificial anodes or applying current to an inert anode to produce a calcareous deposit, which will help shield the metal from further attack.

== Metal dusting ==
Metal dusting is a catastrophic form of corrosion that occurs when susceptible materials are exposed to environments with high carbon activities, such as synthesis gas and other high-CO environments. The corrosion manifests itself as a break-up of bulk metal to metal powder. The suspected mechanism is firstly the deposition of a graphite layer on the surface of the metal, usually from carbon monoxide (CO) in the vapor phase. This graphite layer is then thought to form metastable M_{3}C species (where M is the metal), which migrate away from the metal surface. However, in some regimes, no M_{3}C species is observed indicating a direct transfer of metal atoms into the graphite layer.

== Protection from corrosion ==
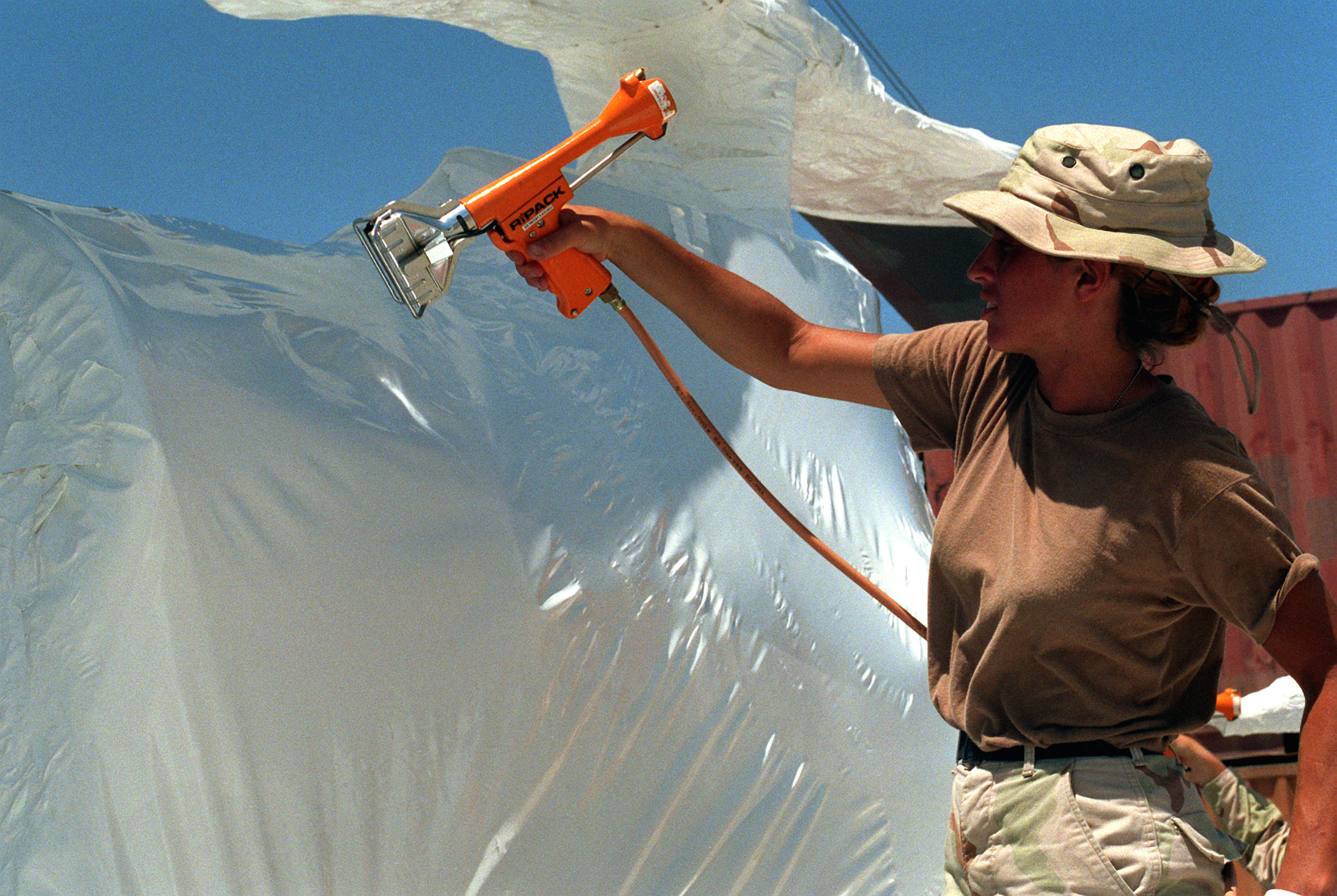
The US military shrink-wraps equipment such as helicopters to protect them from corrosion, thus saving millions of dollars

Various treatments are used to slow corrosion damage to metallic objects which are exposed to the weather, salt water, acids, or other hostile environments. Some unprotected metallic alloys are extremely vulnerable to corrosion, such as those used in neodymium magnets, which can spall or crumble into powder even in dry, temperature-stable indoor environments unless properly treated.

=== Surface treatments ===
When surface treatments are used to reduce corrosion, great care must be taken to ensure complete coverage, without gaps, cracks, or pinhole defects. Small defects can act as an "Achilles' heel", allowing corrosion to penetrate the interior and causing extensive damage even while the outer protective layer remains apparently intact for a period of time.

==== Applied coatings ====
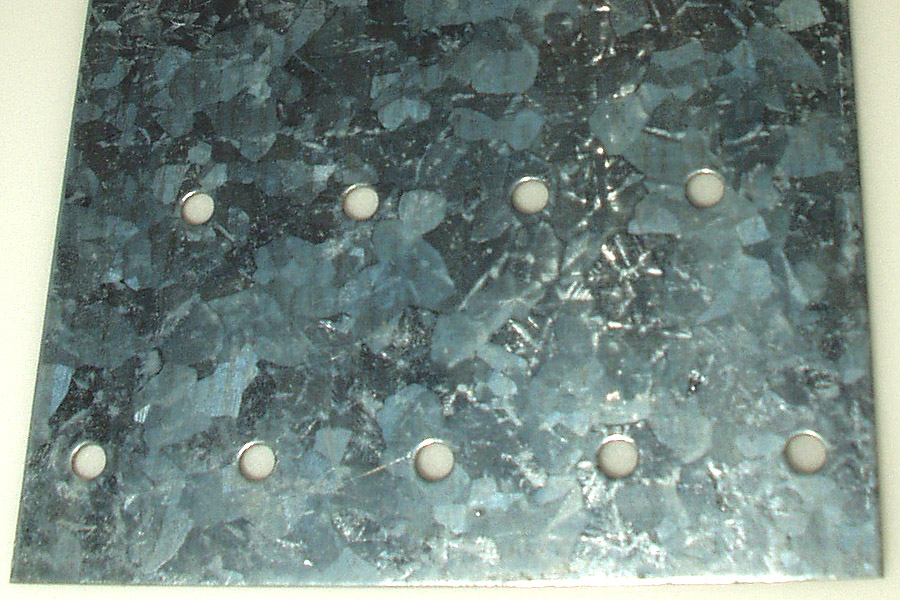
Galvanized surface

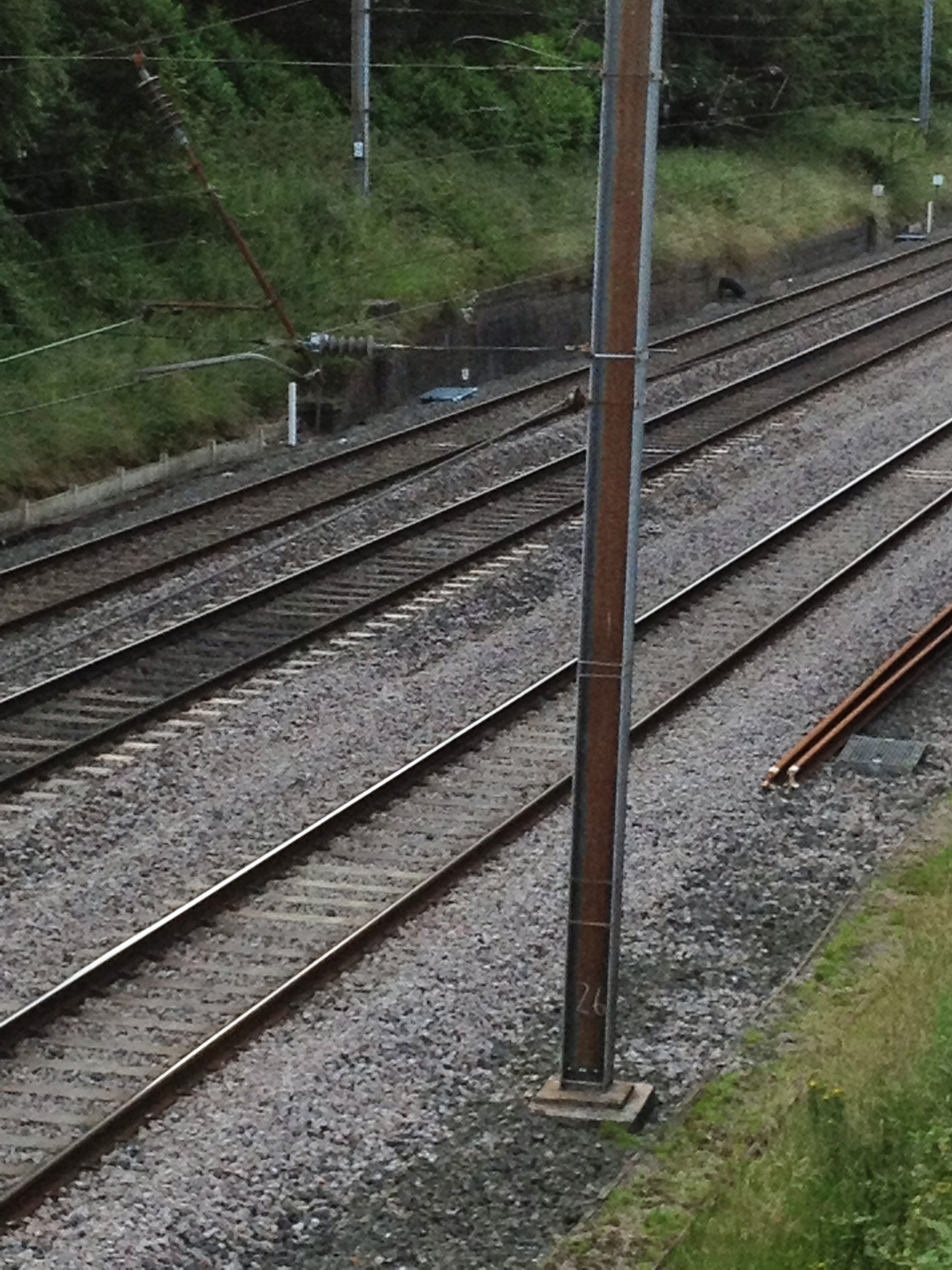
Corroding steel gantry on an electrified railway line

Plating, painting, and the application of enamel are the most common anti-corrosion treatments. They work by providing a barrier of corrosion-resistant material between the damaging environment and the structural material. Aside from cosmetic and manufacturing issues, there may be tradeoffs in mechanical flexibility versus resistance to abrasion and high temperature. Platings usually fail only in small sections, but if the plating is more noble than the substrate (for example, chromium on steel), a galvanic couple will cause any exposed area to corrode much more rapidly than an unplated surface would. For this reason, it is often wise to plate with active metal such as zinc or cadmium. If the zinc coating is not thick enough the surface soon becomes unsightly with rusting obvious. The design life is directly related to the metal coating thickness.

Painting either by roller or brush is more desirable for tight spaces; spray would be better for larger coating areas such as steel decks and waterfront applications. Flexible polyurethane coatings, like Durabak-M26 for example, can provide an anti-corrosive seal with a highly durable slip resistant membrane. Painted coatings are relatively easy to apply and have fast drying times although temperature and humidity may cause dry times to vary.

==== Reactive coatings ====
If the environment is controlled (especially in recirculating systems), corrosion inhibitors can often be added to it. These chemicals form an electrically insulating or chemically impermeable coating on exposed metal surfaces, to suppress electrochemical reactions. Such methods make the system less sensitive to scratches or defects in the coating, since extra inhibitors can be made available wherever metal becomes exposed. Chemicals that inhibit corrosion include some of the salts in hard water (Roman water systems are known for their mineral deposits), chromates, phosphates, polyaniline, other conducting polymers, and a wide range of specially designed chemicals that resemble surfactants (i.e., long-chain organic molecules with ionic end groups).

==== Anodization ====
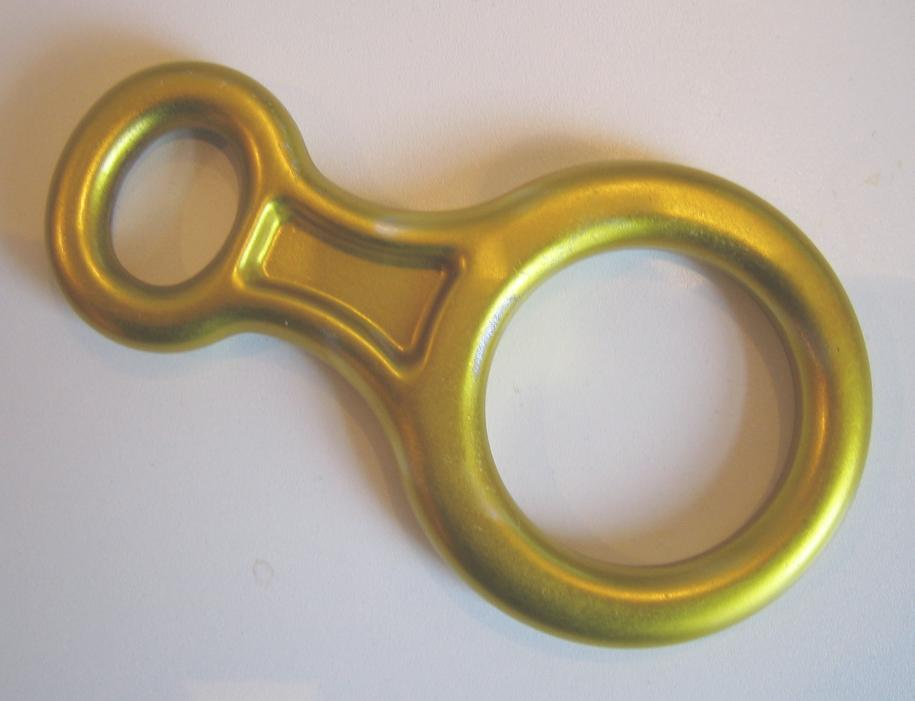
This climbing descender is anodized with a yellow finish.

Aluminium alloys often undergo a surface treatment. Electrochemical conditions in the bath are carefully adjusted so that uniform pores, several nanometers wide, appear in the metal's oxide film. These pores allow the oxide to grow much thicker than passivating conditions would allow. At the end of the treatment, the pores are allowed to seal, forming a harder-than-usual surface layer. If this coating is scratched, normal passivation processes take over to protect the damaged area.

Anodizing is very resilient to weathering and corrosion, so it is commonly used for building facades and other areas where the surface will come into regular contact with the elements. While being resilient, it must be cleaned frequently. If left without cleaning, panel edge staining will naturally occur. Anodization is the process of converting an anode into cathode by bringing a more active anode in contact with it.

==== Biofilm coatings ====
A new form of protection has been developed by applying certain species of bacterial films to the surface of metals in highly corrosive environments. This process increases the corrosion resistance substantially. Alternatively, antimicrobial-producing biofilms can be used to inhibit mild steel corrosion from sulfate-reducing bacteria.

=== Controlled permeability formwork ===
Controlled permeability formwork (CPF) is a method of preventing the corrosion of reinforcement by naturally enhancing the durability of the cover during concrete placement. CPF has been used in environments to combat the effects of carbonation, chlorides, frost, and abrasion.

=== Cathodic protection ===
Cathodic protection (CP) is a technique to control the corrosion of a metal surface by making it the cathode of an electrochemical cell. Cathodic protection systems are most commonly used to protect steel pipelines and tanks; steel pier piles, ships, and offshore oil platforms.

==== Sacrificial anode protection ====
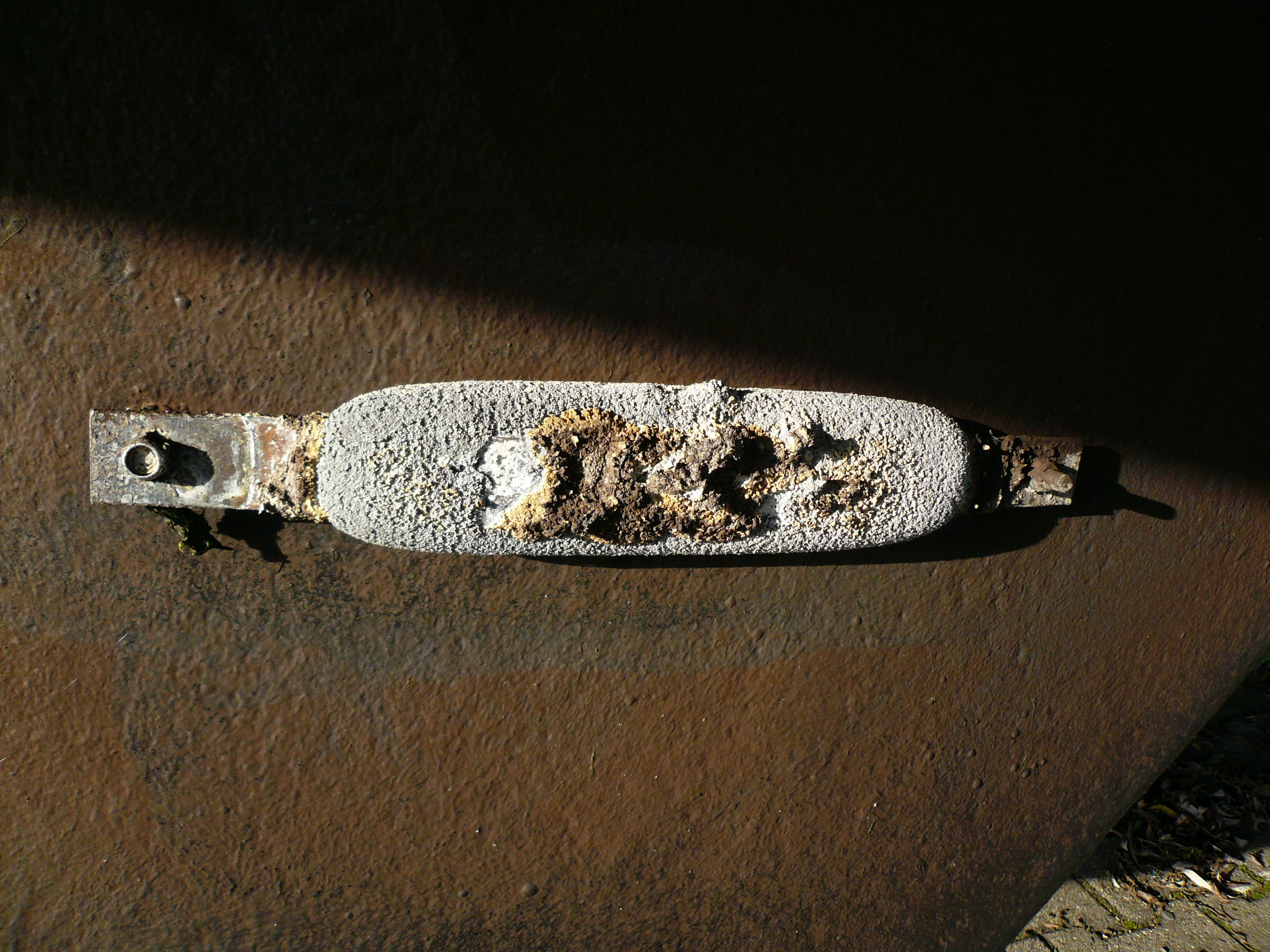
Sacrificial anode attached to the hull of a ship

For effective CP, the potential of the steel surface is polarized (pushed) more negative until the metal surface has a uniform potential. With a uniform potential, the driving force for the corrosion reaction is halted. For galvanic CP systems, the anode material corrodes under the influence of the steel, and eventually it must be replaced. The polarization is caused by the current flow from the anode to the cathode, driven by the difference in electrode potential between the anode and the cathode. The most common sacrificial anode materials are aluminum, zinc, magnesium and related alloys. Aluminum has the highest capacity, and magnesium has the highest driving voltage and is thus used where resistance is higher. Zinc is general purpose and the basis for galvanizing.

A number of problems are associated with sacrificial anodes. Among these, from an environmental perspective, is the release of zinc, magnesium, aluminum and heavy metals such as cadmium into the environment including seawater. From a working perspective, sacrificial anodes systems are considered to be less precise than modern cathodic protection systems such as Impressed Current Cathodic Protection (ICCP) systems. Their ability to provide requisite protection has to be checked regularly by means of underwater inspection by divers. Furthermore, as they have a finite lifespan, sacrificial anodes need to be replaced regularly over time.

==== Impressed current cathodic protection ====
For larger structures, galvanic anodes cannot economically deliver enough current to provide complete protection. Impressed current cathodic protection (ICCP) systems use anodes connected to a DC power source (such as a cathodic protection rectifier). Anodes for ICCP systems are tubular and solid rod shapes of various specialized materials. These include high silicon cast iron, graphite, mixed metal oxide or platinum coated titanium or niobium coated rod and wires.

=== Anodic protection ===
Anodic protection impresses anodic current on the structure to be protected (opposite to the cathodic protection). It is appropriate for metals that exhibit passivity (e.g. stainless steel) and suitably small passive current over a wide range of potentials. It is used in aggressive environments, such as solutions of sulfuric acid. Anodic protection is an electrochemical method of corrosion protection by keeping metal in passive state

=== Rate of corrosion ===
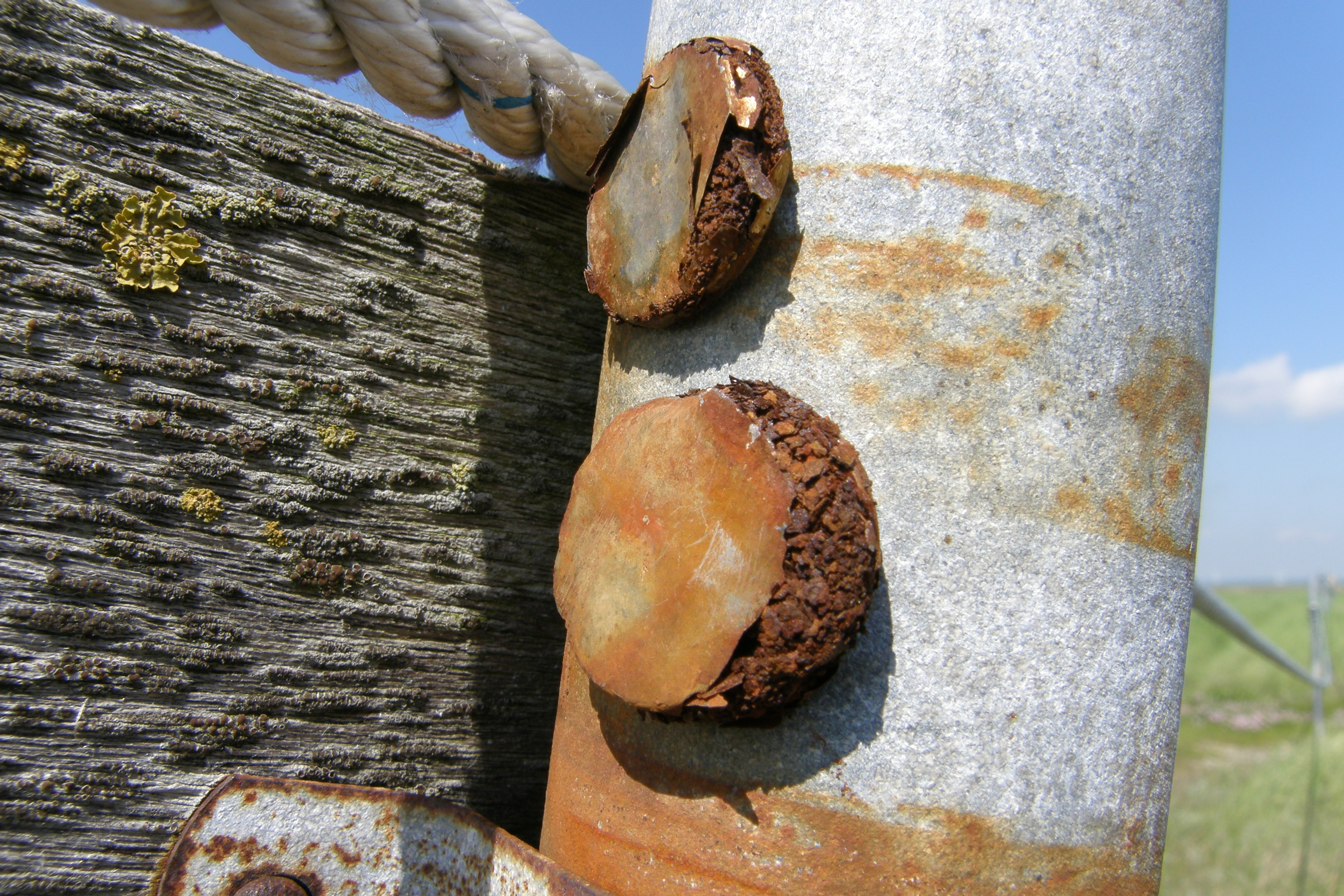
These neodymium magnets corroded extremely rapidly after only five months of outside exposure.

The formation of an oxide layer is described by the Deal–Grove model, which is used to predict and control oxide layer formation in diverse situations. A simple test for measuring corrosion is the weight loss method. The method involves exposing a clean weighed piece of the metal or alloy to the corrosive environment for a specified time followed by cleaning to remove corrosion products and weighing the piece to determine the loss of weight. The rate of corrosion (R) is calculated as

$$R = \frac{kW}{\rho At}$$

where k is a constant, W is the weight loss of the metal in time t, A is the surface area of the metal exposed, and ρ is the density of the metal (in g/cm^{3}).

Other common expressions for the corrosion rate is penetration depth and change of mechanical properties.

== Economic impact ==
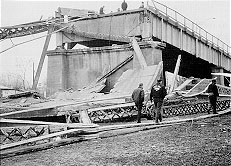
The collapsed Silver Bridge, as seen from the Ohio side

In 2002, the US Federal Highway Administration released a study titled "Corrosion Costs and Preventive Strategies in the United States" on the direct costs associated with metallic corrosion in the US industry. In 1998, the total annual direct cost of corrosion in the US roughly $276 billion (or 3.2% of the US gross domestic product at the time). Broken down into five specific industries, the economic losses are $22.6 billion in infrastructure, $17.6 billion in production and manufacturing, $29.7 billion in transportation, $20.1 billion in government, and $47.9 billion in utilities.

Rust is one of the most common causes of bridge accidents. As rust displaces a much higher volume than the originating mass of iron, its build-up can also cause failure by forcing apart adjacent components. It was the cause of the collapse of the Mianus River Bridge in 1983, when support bearings rusted internally and pushed one corner of the road slab off its support. Three drivers on the roadway at the time died as the slab fell into the river below. The following NTSB investigation showed that a drain in the road had been blocked for road re-surfacing, and had not been unblocked; as a result, runoff water penetrated the support hangers. Rust was also an important factor in the Silver Bridge disaster of 1967 in West Virginia, when a steel suspension bridge collapsed within a minute, killing 46 drivers and passengers who were on the bridge at the time.

Similarly, corrosion of concrete-covered steel and iron can cause the concrete to spall, creating severe structural problems. It is one of the most common failure modes of reinforced concrete bridges. Measuring instruments based on the half-cell potential can detect the potential corrosion spots before total failure of the concrete structure is reached. A 2026 full-scale case study on an underground reinforced-concrete potable water tank built in 1968 combined continuous half-cell potential, concrete resistivity, corrosion current density and temperature measurements at multiple monitoring points to track corrosion progression over time. The study found markedly different corrosion behaviour depending on element exposure, with beams above the waterline remaining largely passive while columns subjected to prolonged immersion showed the highest vulnerability, and used the measured corrosion current together with Faraday's law to estimate reinforcement section loss and support predictive, scenario-based maintenance planning rather than reactive repair after visible damage.

Until 20–30 years ago, galvanized steel pipe was used extensively in the potable water systems for single and multi-family residents as well as commercial and public construction. Today, these systems have long ago consumed the protective zinc and are corroding internally, resulting in poor water quality and pipe failures. The economic impact on homeowners, condo dwellers, and the public infrastructure is estimated at $22 billion as the insurance industry braces for a wave of claims due to pipe failures.

== Corrosion in nonmetals ==
Most ceramic materials are almost entirely immune to corrosion. The strong chemical bonds that hold them together leave very little free chemical energy in the structure; they can be thought of as already corroded. When corrosion does occur, it is almost always a simple dissolution of the material or chemical reaction, rather than an electrochemical process. A common example of corrosion protection in ceramics is the lime added to soda–lime glass to reduce its solubility in water; though it is not nearly as soluble as pure sodium silicate, normal glass does form sub-microscopic flaws when exposed to moisture. Due to its brittleness, such flaws cause a dramatic reduction in the strength of a glass object during its first few hours at room temperature.

=== Corrosion of polymers ===
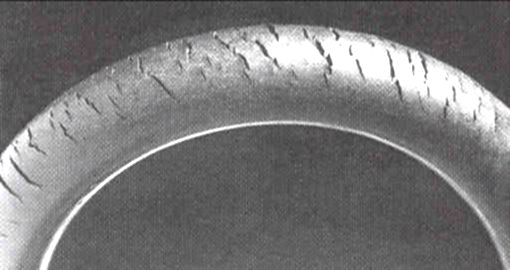
Ozone cracking in natural rubber tubing

Polymer degradation involves several complex and often poorly understood physiochemical processes. These are strikingly different from the other processes discussed here, and so the term "corrosion" is only applied to them in a loose sense of the word. Because of their large molecular weight, very little entropy can be gained by mixing a given mass of polymer with another substance, making them generally quite difficult to dissolve. While dissolution is a problem in some polymer applications, it is relatively simple to design against.

A more common and related problem is "swelling", where small molecules infiltrate the structure, reducing strength and stiffness and causing a volume change. Conversely, many polymers (notably flexible vinyl) are intentionally swelled with plasticizers, which can be leached out of the structure, causing brittleness or other undesirable changes.

The most common form of degradation, however, is a decrease in polymer chain length. Mechanisms which break polymer chains are familiar to biologists because of their effect on DNA: ionizing radiation (most commonly ultraviolet light), free radicals, and oxidizers such as oxygen, ozone, and chlorine. Ozone cracking is a well-known problem affecting natural rubber for example. Plastic additives can slow these process very effectively, and can be as simple as a UV-absorbing pigment (e.g., titanium dioxide or carbon black). Plastic shopping bags often do not include these additives so that they break down more easily as ultrafine particles of litter.

=== Corrosion of glass ===
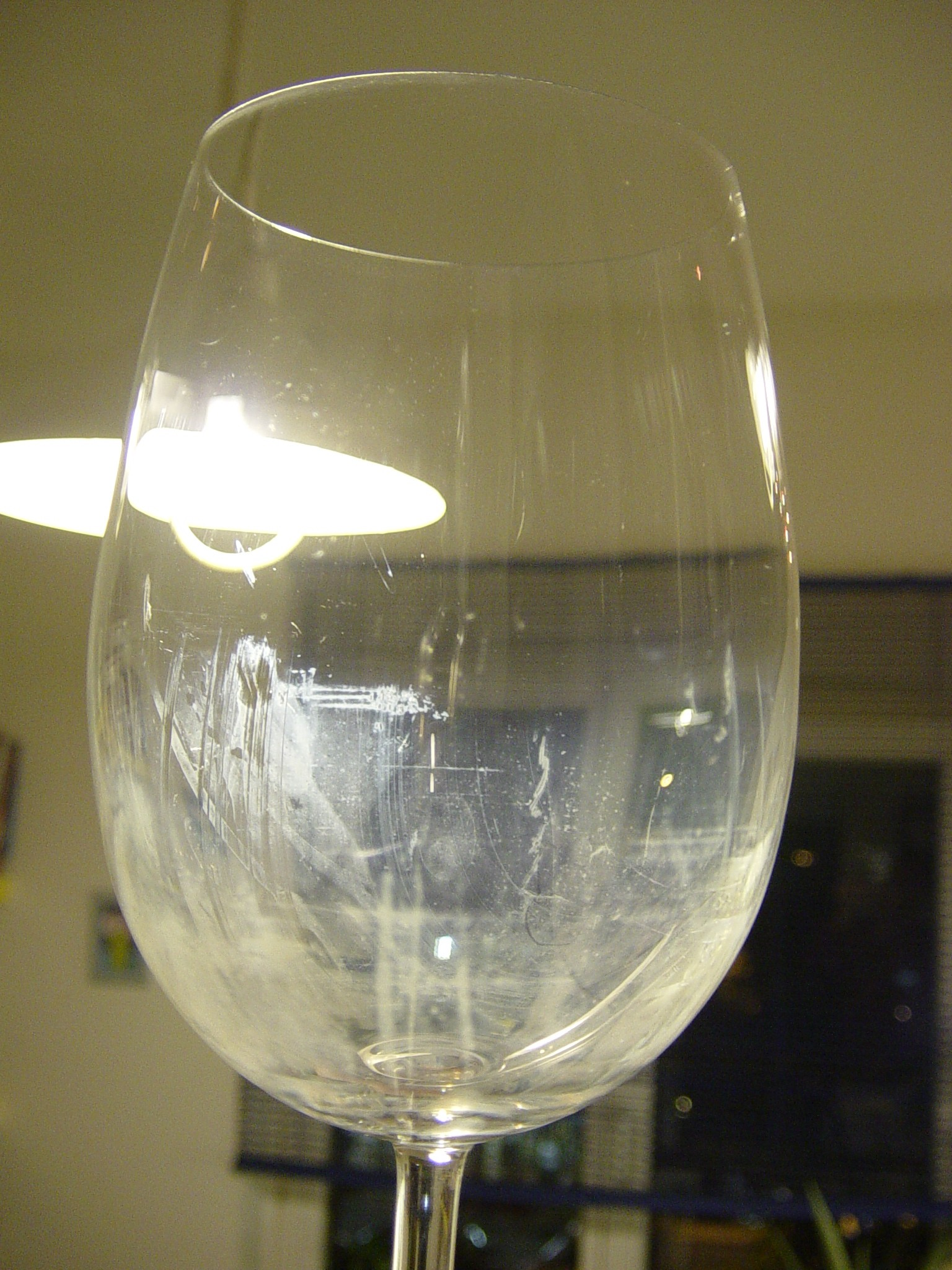
Glass corrosion

Glass is characterized by a high degree of corrosion resistance. Because of its high water resistance, it is often used as primary packaging material in the pharmaceutical industry since most medicines are preserved in a watery solution. Besides its water resistance, glass is also robust when exposed to certain chemically-aggressive liquids or gases.

Glass disease is the corrosion of silicate glasses in aqueous solutions. It is governed by two mechanisms: diffusion-controlled leaching (ion exchange) and hydrolytic dissolution of the glass network. Both mechanisms strongly depend on the pH of contacting solution: the rate of ion exchange decreases with pH as 10^{−0.5pH}, whereas the rate of hydrolytic dissolution increases with pH as 10^{0.5pH}.

Mathematically, corrosion rates of glasses are characterized by normalized corrosion rates of elements NR_{i} (g/cm^{2}·d) which are determined as the ratio of total amount of released species into the water M_{i} (g) to the water-contacting surface area S (cm^{2}), time of contact t (days), and weight fraction content of the element in the glass f_{i}:

$$\mathrm{NR}_i = \frac{M_i}{Sf_it}$$.

The overall corrosion rate is a sum of contributions from both mechanisms (leaching + dissolution): NR_{i}=NRx_{i}+NRh. Diffusion-controlled leaching (ion exchange) is characteristic of the initial phase of corrosion and involves replacement of alkali ions in the glass by a hydronium (H_{3}O^{+}) ion from the solution. It causes an ion-selective depletion of near surface layers of glasses and gives an inverse-square-root dependence of corrosion rate with exposure time. The diffusion-controlled normalized leaching rate of cations from glasses (g/cm^{2}·d) is given by:

$$\mathrm{NR}x_i = 2\rho \sqrt{\frac{D_i}{\pi t}}$$,

where t is time, D_{i} is the ith cation effective diffusion coefficient (cm^{2}/d), which depends on pH of contacting water as D_{i} = D_{i0}·10^{–pH}, and ρ is the density of the glass (g/cm^{3}).

Glass network dissolution is characteristic of the later phases of corrosion and causes a congruent release of ions into the water solution at a time-independent rate in dilute solutions (g/cm^{2}·d):

$$\mathrm{NR}h = \rho r_h$$,

where r_{h} is the stationary hydrolysis (dissolution) rate of the glass (cm/d). In closed systems, the consumption of protons from the aqueous phase increases the pH and causes a fast transition to hydrolysis. However, a further saturation of solution with silica impedes hydrolysis and causes the glass to return to an ion-exchange; e.g., diffusion-controlled regime of corrosion.

In typical natural conditions, normalized corrosion rates of silicate glasses are very low and are of the order of 10^{−7} to 10^{−5} g/(cm^{2}·d). The very high durability of silicate glasses in water makes them suitable for hazardous and nuclear waste immobilisation.

==== Glass corrosion tests ====
Effect of addition of a certain glass component on the chemical durability against water corrosion of a specific base glass (corrosion test ISO 719)

There exist numerous standardized procedures for measuring the corrosion (also called chemical durability) of glasses in neutral, basic, and acidic environments, under simulated environmental conditions, in simulated body fluid, at high temperature and pressure, and under other conditions.

The standard procedure ISO 719 describes a test of the extraction of water-soluble basic compounds under neutral conditions: 2 g of glass, particle size 300–500 μm, is kept for 60 min in 50 mL de-ionized water of grade 2 at 98 °C; 25 mL of the obtained solution is titrated against 0.01 mol/L HCl solution. The volume of HCl required for neutralization is classified according to the table below.

Amount of 0.01M HCl needed to neutralize extracted basic oxides, mL	Extracted Na_{2}O equivalent, μg	Hydrolytic class
< 0.1	< 31	1
0.1-0.2	31-62	2
0.2-0.85	62-264	3
0.85-2.0	264-620	4
2.0-3.5	620-1085	5
> 3.5	> 1085	> 5

The standardized test ISO 719 is not suitable for glasses with poor or not extractable alkaline components, but which are still attacked by water; e.g., quartz glass, B_{2}O_{3} glass or P_{2}O_{5} glass.

Usual glasses are differentiated into the following classes:

- Hydrolytic class 1 (Type I): This class, which is also called neutral glass, includes borosilicate glasses (e.g., Duran, Pyrex, Fiolax). Glass of this class contains essential quantities of boron oxides, aluminium oxides and alkaline earth oxides. Through its composition neutral glass has a high resistance against temperature shocks and the highest hydrolytic resistance. Against acid and neutral solutions it shows high chemical resistance, because of its poor alkali content against alkaline solutions.
- Hydrolytic class 2 (Type II): This class usually contains sodium silicate glasses with a high hydrolytic resistance through surface finishing. Sodium silicate glass is a silicate glass, which contains alkali- and alkaline earth oxide and primarily sodium oxide and calcium oxide.
- Hydrolytic class 3 (Type III): Glass of the 3rd hydrolytic class usually contains sodium silicate glasses and has a mean hydrolytic resistance, which is two times poorer than of type 1 glasses. Acid class DIN 12116 and alkali class DIN 52322 (ISO 695) are to be distinguished from the hydrolytic class DIN 12111 (ISO 719).

== See also ==
- Anaerobic corrosion
- Bacterial anaerobic corrosion
- Chemical hazard label – Warning symbol on locations or products
- Corrosion engineering – Field of engineering dealing with materials
- Corrosion in space – Corrosion of materials occurring in outer space
- Cyclic corrosion testing – Acceleration of real-world corrosion failures
- Dimetcote – Used for steel corrosion resistance
- Electrical resistivity measurement of concrete
- Electronegativity – Tendency of an atom to attract a shared pair of electrons
- Environmental stress fracture – Material failure
- Faraday paradox (electrochemistry) – Resolved paradox in electrochemistry
- Fibre-reinforced plastic tanks and vessels
- Forensic engineering – Investigation of failures associated with legal intervention
- Hydrogen analyzer – Device
- Hydrogen embrittlement – Reduction in ductility of a metal exposed to hydrogen
- Kelvin probe force microscope – Noncontact variant of atomic force microscopy
- Periodic table – Tabular arrangement of the chemical elements
- Pitting resistance equivalent number – Predictive measurement of stainless steel resistance to localized pitting corrosion
- Redox – Chemical reaction involving changes in oxidation state
- Reduction potential – Measure of the tendency of a substance to gain or lose electrons
- Rouging
- Salt spray test – Corrosion test method
- Scanning vibrating electrode technique
- Stress corrosion cracking – Growth of cracks in a corrosive environment
- Tribocorrosion – Material degradation due to corrosion and wear
- Zinc pest – Type of corrosion in zinc
