= Bacterial anaerobic corrosion =

Bacterial anaerobic corrosion is the bacterially-induced oxidation of metals. Corrosion of metals typically alters the metal to a form that is more stable. Thus, bacterial anaerobic corrosion typically occurs in conditions favorable to the corrosion of the underlying substrate. In humid, anoxic conditions the corrosion of metals occurs as a result of a redox reaction. This redox reaction generates molecular hydrogen from local hydrogen ions. Conversely, anaerobic corrosion occurs spontaneously. Anaerobic corrosion primarily occurs on metallic substrates but may also occur on concrete.

Diagram of bacterially-induced corrosion.

== Details ==
Bacterial anaerobic corrosion typically impacts metallic substrates but may also occur in concrete. Corrosion of concrete media leads to considerable losses in industrial settings. When considering the corrosion of concrete there is significant documentation of structural degradation in concrete wastewater infrastructure where wastewater is collected or treated. Similarly, biofilms are important for bacterial anaerobic corrosion of metals in wastewater pipes.

For bacterial anaerobic corrosion there is general corrosion of substrates as well as another form of corrosion known as pitting. In both general or pitting corrosion, the breakdown process occurs in aqueous conditions. Bacteria tend to form biofilms as their primary means of corroding metals, with different bacteria dominating across different settings. In municipal wastewater, Desulfovibrio desulfuricans is the main contributor to corrosion.

== Chemistry ==
A base metal, such as iron (Fe) goes into aqueous solution as positively charged cation, Fe^{2+}. As the metal is oxidized under anaerobic conditions by the protons of water, H^{+} ions are reduced to form molecular H_{2}. This can be written in the following ways under acidic and neutral conditions respectively:

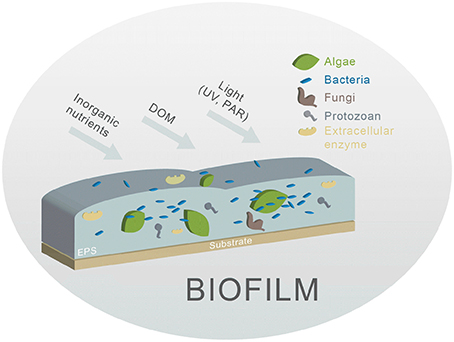
An example of a biofilm blocking and insulating a given substrate from external pressures. Note that this biofilm is of variable community.

Fe + 2 H^{+} → Fe^{2+} + H_{2}
Fe + 2 H_{2}O → Fe(OH)_{2} + H_{2}

Usually, a thin film of molecular hydrogen forms on the metal. Sulfate-reducing bacteria oxidize the molecular hydrogen to produce hydrogen sulfide ions (HS^{−}) and water:

4 H_{2} + SO^{2−}_{4} → HS^{−} + 3 H_{2}O + OH^{−}

The iron ions partly precipitate to form iron (II) sulfide. Another reaction occurs between iron and water producing iron hydroxide.

Fe^{2+} + HS^{−} → FeS + H^{+}
3 Fe^{2+} + 6 H_{2}O → 3 Fe(OH)_{2} + 6 H^{+}

The net equation comes to:

4 Fe + SO^{2−}_{4} + H^{+} + 3 H_{2}O → FeS + 3 Fe(OH)_{2} + OH^{−}

This form of corrosion by sulfate-reducing bacteria can, in this way, be far more harmful than anaerobic corrosion.

== Biofilms and bacterial anaerobic corrosion ==
There is varying impact on local corrosion noted from biofilms formed of diverse microbial communities. For instance, when isolating a sample of biofilm from a pipe within the first week of growth, the corrosion of the pipe accelerated, yet by the end of a month, the same biofilm began to act as a protective layer for the pipe. Variation between corrosion in similar environments might be attributed to the local bacterial communities. Biofilms further mediate corrosion by altering the electrochemical processes at the interface of the underlying substrate.

== See also ==
- Corrosion
- Microbial corrosion
- Methanogen
- Denitrifying Bacteria
