= Micro pitting =

Fatigue failure of the surface of a material insufficiently lubricated

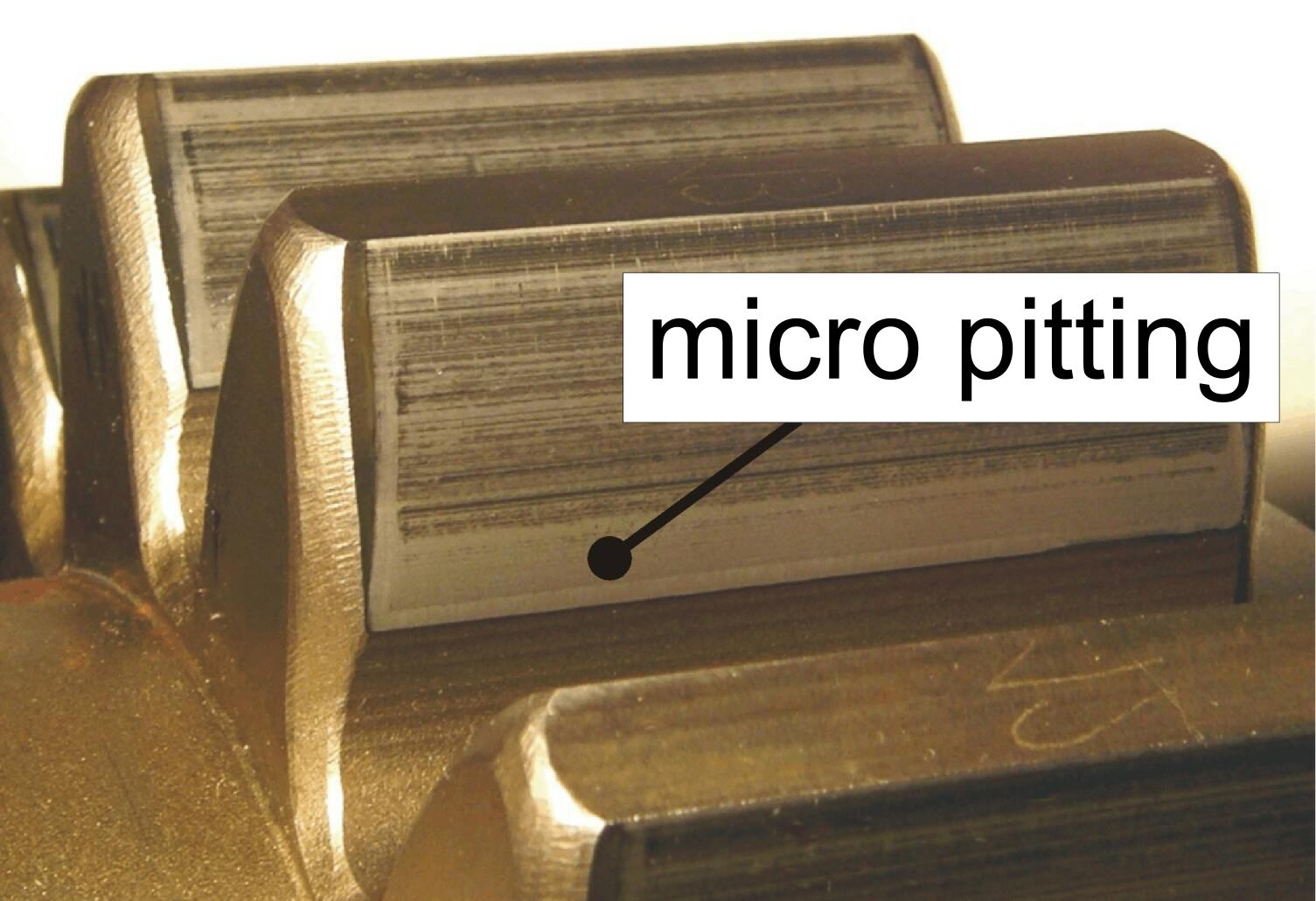
Section of a gear wheel showing micro pitting on the tooth

Micro pitting is a fatigue failure of the surface of a material commonly seen in rolling bearings and gears. It is also known as grey staining, micro spalling or frosting.

== Pitting and micropitting ==
The difference between pitting and micropitting is the size of the pits after surface fatigue. Pits formed by micropitting are approximately 10–20 μm in depth, and to the unaided eye, micropitting appears dull, etched or stained, with patches of gray. Normal pitting creates larger and more visible pits. Micropits are originated from the local contact of asperities produced by improper lubrication.

== Causes ==
In a normal bearing the surfaces are separated by a layer of oil, this is known as elastohydrodynamic (EHD) lubrication. If the thickness of the EHD film is of the same order of magnitude as the surface roughness, the surface topography is able to interact and cause micro pitting. A thin EHD film may be caused by excess load or temperature, a lower oil viscosity than is required, low speed or water in the oil. Water in the oil can make micro pitting worse by causing hydrogen embrittlement of the surface. Micro pitting occurs only under poor EHD lubrication conditions and although it can affect all types of gears, it can be particularly troublesome in heavily loaded gears with hardened teeth.

A surface with a deep scratch might break exactly at the scratch if stress is applied. One can imagine that the surface roughness is a composite of many very small scratches. So high surface roughness decreases the stability on heavy stressed parts. To get a good overview of the surface an areal scan (surface metrology) gives more information than a measurement along a single profile (profileometer). To quantify the surface roughness the ISO 25178 can be used.

== Calculation ==
ISO/TS 6336-22 contains a method for a calculation of risk of micropitting in gear sets.

== Related usage ==
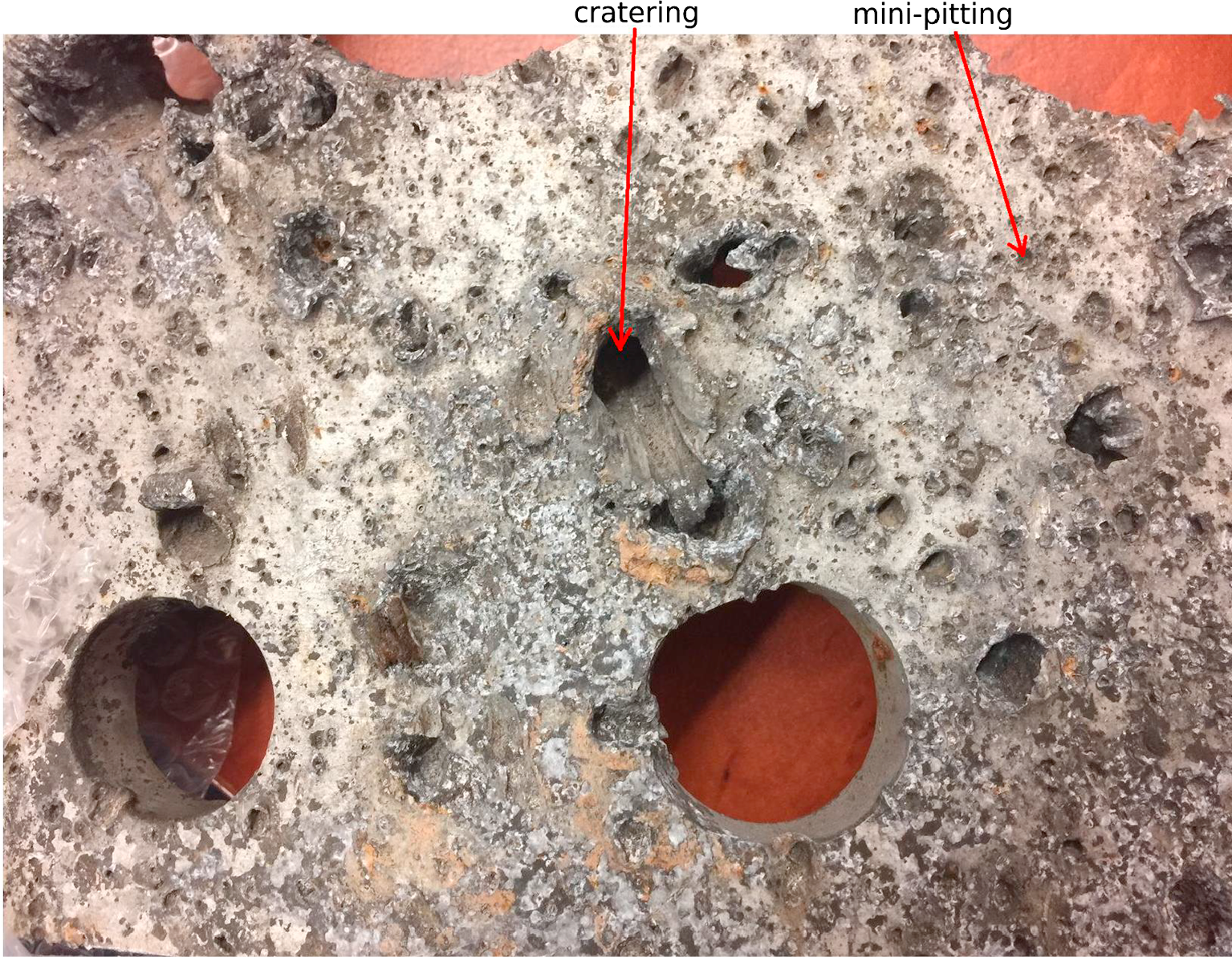
Metal showing micro-pitting, with the bigger spots of mini-pitting and cratering marked.

The term micropitting is used in explosion investigation and forensic analysis to describe small pits on the surface of recovered fragments, caused by the impact of hot gases generated during the detonation of a high-energy explosive. It is considered one of the most important and most frequently observed forms of material damage indicative of an explosion, particularly in the forensic examination of aircraft wreckage.

== See also ==
- Pitting corrosion
- Corrosion
