= Metal dusting =

Metal dusting is "a catastrophic form of corrosion that occurs when susceptible materials are exposed to environments with high carbon activities." The corrosion manifests itself as a break-up of bulk metal to metal powder. The suspected mechanism is firstly the deposition of a graphite layer on the surface of the metal, usually from carbon monoxide (CO) in the vapour phase. This graphite layer is then thought to form metastable M_{3}C species (where M is the metal), which migrate away from the metal surface. However, in some regimes no M_{3}C species are observed indicating a direct transfer of metal atoms into the graphite layer.

The temperatures normally associated with metal dusting are high (300–850 °C). From a general understanding of chemistry, it can be deduced that at lower temperatures, the rate of reaction to form the metastable M_{3}C species is too low to be significant, and at much higher temperatures the graphite layer is unstable and so CO deposition does not occur (at least to any appreciable degree).

Very briefly, there are several proposed methods for prevention or reduction of metal dusting; the most common seem to be aluminide coatings, alloying with copper and addition of steam.

There is a significant amount of literature in existence that describes proposed mechanisms, prevention methods, etc. There is also a good summary of metal dusting and some prevention methods in 'Corrosion by Carbon and Nitrogen - Metal Dusting, Carburisation and Nitridation'.
