= Anaerobic corrosion =

Bacteria-induced anaerobic corrosion of a piece of iron

Anaerobic corrosion (also known as hydrogen corrosion) is a form of metal corrosion occurring in anoxic water. Typically following aerobic corrosion, anaerobic corrosion involves a redox reaction that reduces hydrogen ions and oxidizes a solid metal. This process can occur in either abiotic conditions through a thermodynamically spontaneous reaction or biotic conditions through a process known as bacterial anaerobic corrosion. Along with other forms of corrosion, anaerobic corrosion is significant when considering the safe, permanent storage of chemical waste.

== Chemical mechanisms ==
The overall process of corrosion can be represented by a bimodal function, where the type of corrosion varies with time, including both oxygen-driven and anaerobic mechanisms. The dominant process will depend on the given conditions. During oxygen-driven corrosion, layers of rust form, creating various non-homogenous anoxic niches throughout the metal's surface. Within the niches the diffusion of oxygen is inhibited, leading to the ideal conditions for anaerobic corrosion to occur.

=== Abiotic ===
Under anoxic conditions, the mechanism for corrosion requires a substitute for oxygen as the oxidizing agent in the redox reaction. For abiotic anaerobic corrosion, that substitute is the hydrogen ion produced in the dissociation of water and the proceeding reduction of the hydrogen ions into diatomic hydrogen gas. The anodic half-reaction involves the oxidation of a metal in aqueous solution into a metal hydroxide. A common reaction that represents this process is the transformation of solid iron in steel into ferrous hydroxide as visualized in the following overall redox reaction.

$Fe_{(s)}\;+\;2\,H_{2}O\;\rightarrow\;Fe(OH)_2\;+\;H_{2(g)}\;$

The ferrous hydroxide may be oxidized further by additional hydrogen ions in water to form the mineral magnetite (Fe_{3}O_{4}) in the process called the Schikorr reaction.

In general, the anaerobic corrosion of metals, such as iron and copper, occur at very slow rates. However, when in chloride-containing aqueous environments, the rate increases because of the introduction of new mechanisms with the addition of a chloride anions.

=== Biotic ===
When in biotic conditions, anaerobic corrosion can be facilitated by the metabolic activity of microorganisms in the surrounding environment. This process is known as microbiologically-influenced corrosion or bacterial anaerobic corrosion. Most notably, the production of dissolved sulfides by sulfate-reducing bacteria (SRB) react with solid metals and hydrogen ions to form metal sulfides in a redox reaction.

== Environmental significance ==
The effects of anaerobic corrosion are evident when evaluating the safety of chemical waste disposal. Currently, the permanent disposal of nuclear waste is commonly in deep geological repositories (DGR) that use copper coating to prevent metal corrosion. In the DGR, four major types of corrosion are expected to occur, including oxygen-driven, radiation-influenced, anaerobic, and microbiologically-influenced corrosion. Of these, the most notable process is the microbiologically-influenced corrosion in terms of the magnitude of corrosion. The ability of microorganisms such as SRB to survive in a wide range of environments also lends to their relevance when considering the threat of corrosion to permanent chemical waste disposal.

== See also ==
- Corrosion
- Bacterial anaerobic corrosion
- Electrochemistry
- Sulfate-reducing microorganism
- Redox reaction
