= Pitting corrosion =

Form of insidious localized corrosion in which a pit develops at the anode site

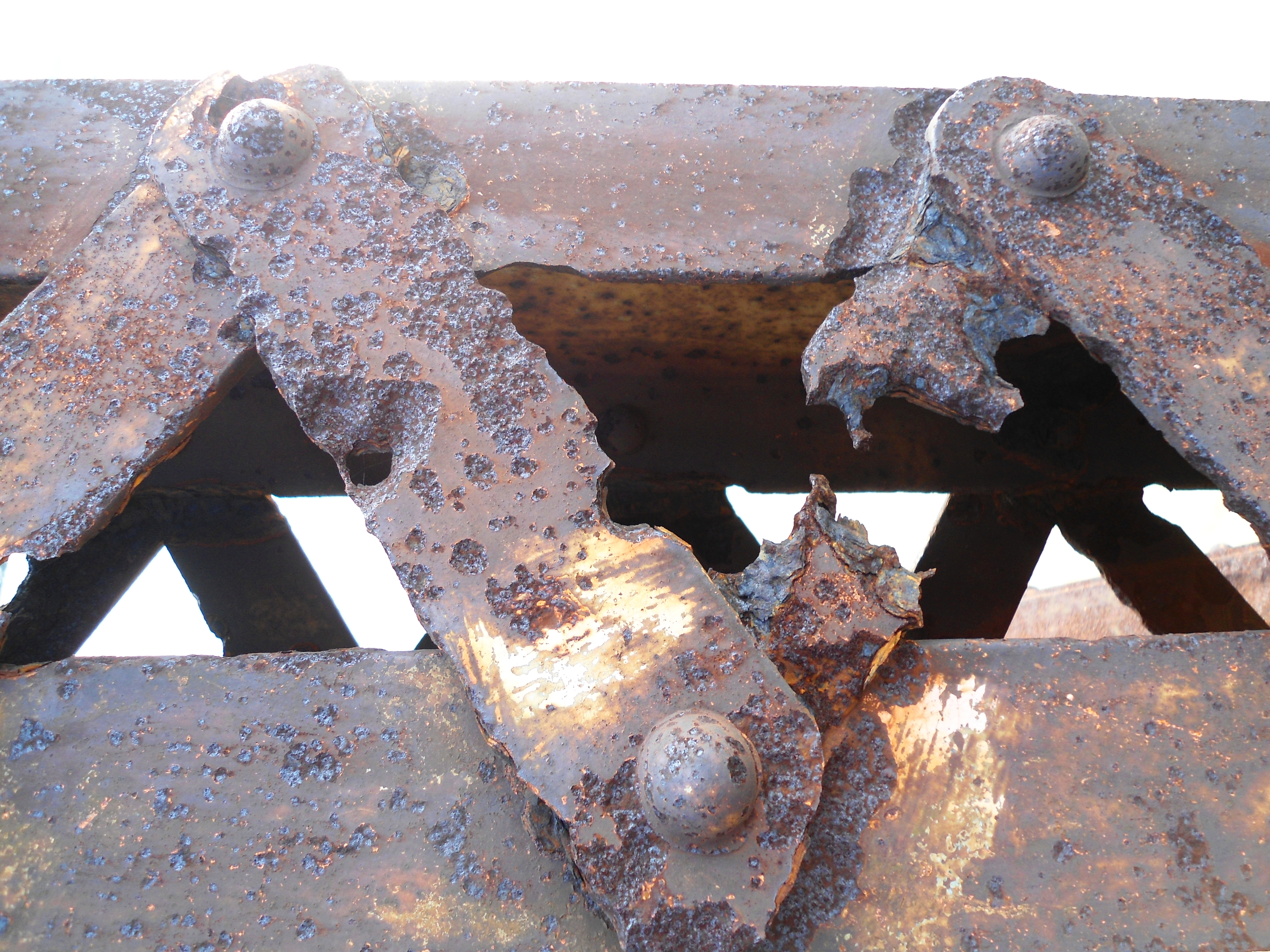
Severe pitting corrosion problems caused by chloride ions on a truss beam of the Nandu River Iron Bridge (Hainan Province, China), leading to the complete rupture of a metallic element.

Pitting corrosion, or pitting, is a form of extremely localized corrosion that leads to the random creation of small holes in metal. The driving power for pitting corrosion is the depassivation of a small area, which becomes anodic (oxidation reaction) while an unknown but potentially vast area becomes cathodic (reduction reaction), leading to very localized galvanic corrosion. The corrosion penetrates the mass of the metal, with a limited diffusion of ions.

Another term arises, pitting factor, which is defined as the ratio of the depth of the deepest pit (from localized corrosion) to the average penetration depth (mean thickness of the corrosion layer produced by the general uniform corrosion), which can be calculated based on the weight loss and corrosion products density.

== Development and kinetics of pitting ==
According to Frankel (1998) who performed a review on pitting corrosion, it develops in three successive steps: (1) initiation (or nucleation) by breakdown of the passive film protecting the metal surface from oxidation, (2) growth of metastable pits (growing up to the micron scale and then repassivating), and (3) the growth of larger and stable pits.

The evolution of the pit density (number of pits per surface area) as a function of time follows a sigmoid curve with the characteristic shape of a logistic function curve, or a hyperbolic tangent. Guo et al. (2018), after a statistical analysis of hundreds of individual pits observed on carbon steel surfaces at the nano-to-micro- scales, distinguish three stages of pitting corrosion: induction, propagation, and saturation.

== Mechanism ==
The pit formation can be essentially regarded as a two step process: nucleation followed by a growth.

=== Depassivation of the protective layer ===
The process of pit nucleation is initiated by the depassivation of the protective oxide layer isolating the metal substrate from a corrosive solution. The depassivation step is the least-understood step in pitting corrosion, and can be triggered by a variety of factors. Mechanical or physical damage may locally disrupt the protective layer. Crystalline defects, or impurity inclusions, pre-existing in the base metal material can also serve as nucleation points (metal sulfide inclusions in particular). The chemical conditions prevailing in the solution and the nature of the metal, or the alloy composition, of course, have a strong influence as well. Several theories have been elaborated to explain the depassivation process. Anions with weak or strong ligand properties such as chloride (Cl^{−}) and thiosulfate (S_{2}O^{2−}_{3}) respectively can complex the metallic cations (Me^{n+}) present in the protective oxide layer and so contribute to its local dissolution. Chloride anions could also compete with hydroxide ions (OH^{−}) for the sorption onto the oxide layer and start to diffuse into the porosity or the crystal lattice of the oxide layer. Finally, according to the point-defect model elaborated by Digby Macdonald, the migration of crystal defects inside the oxide layer could explain its random localized disappearance. The main interest of the point-defect model is to explain the stochastic character of the pitting corrosion process.

=== Pit growth ===
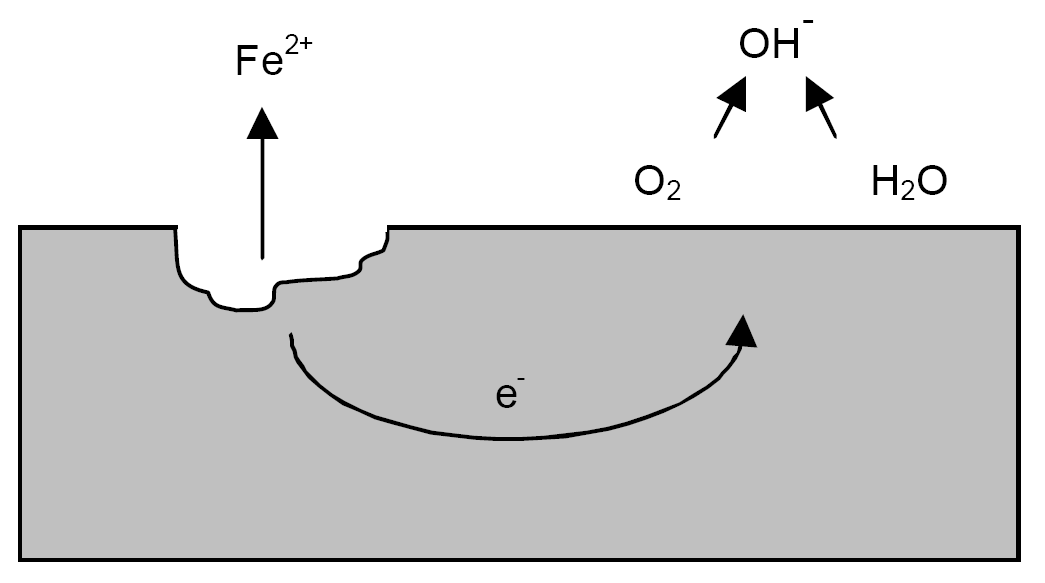
Schematic diagram showing the mechanism of localized corrosion with anodic zone (Fe oxidized into Fe^{2+} inside the pit) and cathodic zone (O_{2} reduced into OH^{−} elsewhere outside the pit) developing on a metal immersed into an aqueous solution containing dissolved oxygen. Here, the pH conditions are neutral or alkaline (presence of OH^{−} ions in solution). The transport of ions occurs into the aqueous solution while electrons are transported from the anode to the cathode via the base metal (electrical conductor).

The more common explanation for pitting corrosion is that it is an autocatalytic process driven by the random formation of small electrochemical cells with separate anodic and cathodic zones. The random local breakdown of the protective oxide layer and the subsequent oxidation of the underlying metal in the anodic zones result in the local formation of a pit where acid conditions are maintained by the spatial separation of the cathodic and anodic half-reactions. This creates a gradient of electrical potential and is responsible for the electromigration of aggressive anions into the pit. For example, when a metal is exposed to an oxygenated aqueous solution containing sodium chloride (NaCl) as electrolyte, the pit acts as anode (metal oxidation) and the metal surface acts as cathode (oxygen reduction).

In the case of pitting corrosion of iron, or carbon steel, by atmospheric oxygen dissolved in acidic water (pH < 7) in contact with the metal exposed surface, the reactions respectively occurring at the anode and cathode zones can be written as follows:

Anode: oxidation of iron: 2 (Fe → Fe^{2+} + 2e^{−})

Cathode: reduction of oxygen: O_{2} + 4H^{+} + 4e^{−} → 2 H_{2}O

Global redox reaction: 2 Fe + O_{2} + 4 H^{+} → 2 Fe^{2+} + 2 H_{2}O

Acidic conditions favor the redox reaction according to Le Chatelier principle because the H^{+} ions added to the reagents side displace the reaction equilibrium to the right and also increase the solubility of the released Fe^{2+} cations.

Under neutral to alkaline conditions (pH > 7), the set of redox reactions given here above becomes the following:

Anode: oxidation of iron: 2 (Fe → Fe^{2+} + 2e^{−})

Cathode: reduction of oxygen: O_{2} + 2 H_{2}O + 4e^{−} → 4 OH^{−}

Global redox reaction: 2 Fe + O_{2} + 2 H_{2}O → 2 Fe(OH)_{2}

The precipitation of Fe(OH)_{2} (green rust) can also contribute to drive the reaction towards the right. However, the solubility of Fe(OH)_{2} (Fe^{2+}) is relatively high (~ 100 times that of Fe^{3+}), but strongly decreases when pH increases because of common ion effect with the OH^{−}.

In the two examples given here above:
– Iron is a reductant giving electrons while being oxidized.
– Oxygen is an oxidant taking up electrons while being reduced.

The formation of anodic and cathodic zones creates an electrochemical cell (i.e., a small electric battery) at the surface of the affected metal. The difference in Gibbs free energy (ΔG) drives the reaction because ΔG is negative and the system releases energy (enthalpy, ΔH < 0) while increasing entropy (ΔG = ΔH - TΔS).

The transport of dissolved ions occurs into the aqueous solution in contact with the corroding metal while electrons are transported from the anode (giving e^{−}) to the cathode (accepting e^{−}) via the base metal (electrical conductor).

The localized production of positive metal (M) cations (M^{n+}, Fe^{2+} in the example here above) in the pit (oxidation: anode) gives a local excess of positive charges which attract the negative ions (e.g., the highly mobile chloride anions Cl^{−}) from the surrounding electrolyte to maintain the electroneutrality of the ion species in aqueous solution in the pit. The pit contains a high concentration of metal chloride (MCl_{n}) which hydrolyzes with water to produce the corresponding metal hydroxide (M(OH)_{n}), and n H^{+} and n Cl^{–} ions, accelerating the corrosion process.

In the case of metallic iron, or steel, the process can be schematized as follows:

Fe^{2+} + Cl^{−} → [FeCl complex]^{+}

[FeCl complex]^{+} + 2 H_{2}O → Fe(OH)_{2} + 2 H^{+} + Cl^{−}

Under basic conditions, such as under the alkaline conditions prevailing in concrete, the hydrolysis reaction directly consumes hydroxides ions (OH^{−}) while releasing chloride ions:

[FeCl complex]^{+} + 2 OH^{−} → Fe(OH)_{2} + Cl^{−}

So, when chloride ions present in solution enter in contact with the steel surface, they react with Fe^{2+} of the passive layer protecting the steel surface and form an iron–chloride complex. Then, the iron-chloride complex reacts with the OH^{−} anions produced by the water dissociation and precipitates ferrous hydroxide (Fe(OH)_{2}) while releasing chloride ions and new H^{+} ions available to continue the corrosion process.

In the pit, the oxygen concentration is essentially zero and all of the cathodic oxygen reactions take place on the metal surface outside the pit. The pit is anodic (oxidation) and the locus of rapid dissolution of the metal. The metal corrosion initiation is autocatalytic in nature however its propagation is not.

This kind of corrosion is often difficult to detect and so is extremely insidious, as it causes little loss of material with the small effect on its surface, while it damages the deep structures of the metal. The pits on the surface are often obscured by corrosion products. Pitting can be initiated by a small surface defect, being a scratch or a local change in the alloy composition (or local impurities, e.g. metallic sulfide inclusions such as MnS or NiS), or a damage to the protective coating. Polished surfaces display a higher resistance to pitting.

=== Capillary electrophoresis in the pit ===
In order to maintain the solution electroneutrality inside the pit populated by cations released by oxidation in the anodic zone (e.g., Fe^{2+} in case of steel), anions need to migrate inside the narrow pit. It is worth to notice that the electromobilities of thiosulfate (S_{2}O^{2−}_{3}) and chloride (Cl^{−}) anions are the highest after these of H^{+} and OH^{−} ions in aqueous solution. Moreover, the molar conductivity of thiosulfate ions is even higher than that of chloride ions because they are twice negatively charged (weak base reluctant to accept a proton). In capillary electrophoresis, thiosulfate moves faster than chloride and eluates before this latter. The high electromobility of both anions could also be one of the many factors explaining their harmful impact for pitting corrosion when compared with other much less damaging ion species such as SO^{2−}_{4} and NO^{−}_{3}.

== Susceptible alloys and environment conditions ==
Pitting corrosion is defined by localized attack, ranging from microns to millimeters in diameter, in an otherwise passive surface and only occurs for specific alloy and environmental combinations. Thus, this type of corrosion typically occurs in alloys that are protected by a tenacious (passivating) oxide film such as stainless steels, nickel alloys, aluminum alloys in environments that contain an aggressive species such as chlorides (Cl^{–}) or thiosulfates (S_{2}O_{3}^{2–}). In contrast, alloy/environment combinations where the passive film is not very protective usually will not produce pitting corrosion. A good example of the importance of alloy/environment combinations is carbon steel. In environments where the pH value is lower than 10, carbon steel does not form a passivating oxide film and the addition of chloride results in uniform attack over the entire surface. However, at pH greater than 10 (alkaline) the oxide is protective and the addition of chloride results in pitting corrosion.

Besides chlorides, other anions implicated in pitting include thiosulfates (S_{2}O_{3}^{2−}), fluorides and iodides. Stagnant water conditions with low concentrations of dissolved oxygen also favor pitting. Thiosulfates are particularly aggressive species and are formed by partial oxidation of pyrite (FeS_{2}, a ferrous disulfide), or partial sulfate reduction by microorganisms, a.o. by sulfate reducing bacteria (SRB). Thiosulfates are a concern for corrosion in many industries handling sulfur-derived compounds: sulfide ores processing, oil wells and pipelines transporting soured oils, kraft paper production plants, photographic industry, methionine and lysine factories.

== Influence of redox conditions ==
Although in the aforementioned example, oxic conditions were always considered with the reduction of dissolved O_{2} in the cathodic zones, pitting corrosion may also occur under anoxic, or reducing, conditions. Indeed, the very harmful reduced species of sulfur (H_{2}S, HS^{−}, S^{2−}, HS–S^{−}, ^{−}S–S^{−}, S^{0} and S_{2}O^{2−}_{3}) can only subsist under reducing conditions. Moreover, in the case of steel and stainless steel, reducing conditions are conducive to the dissolution of the protective oxide layer (dense γ-Fe_{2}O_{3}) because Fe^{2+} is much more soluble than Fe^{3+}, and so reducing conditions contribute to the breakdown of the protective oxide layer (initiation, nucleation of the pit). Reductants exert thus an antagonist effect with respect to the oxidants (chromate, nitrite) used as corrosion inhibitors to induce steel repassivation via the formation of a dense γ-Fe_{2}O_{3} protective layer. Pitting corrosion can thus occur both under oxidizing and reducing conditions and can be aggravated in poorly oxygenated waters by differential aeration, or by drying/wetting cycles.

Under strongly reducing conditions, in the absence of dissolved oxygen in water, or pore water of the ground, the electron acceptor (oxidizing agent) at the cathodic sites, where reduction occurs, can be the protons ( H^{+}) of water itself, the protons of hydrogen sulfide (H_{2}S), or in acidic conditions in case of severe pyrite oxidation in a former oxic atmosphere, dissolved ferric ions (Fe^{3+}), known to be very potent oxidizers. The presence of harmful reduced species of sulfur and microbial activity feeding the sulfur cycle (sulfide oxidation possibly followed by bacterial sulfate reduction) have also to be taken into account. Strictly abiotic (i.e. inorganic) corrosion processes are generally slower under anoxic conditions than under oxic conditions, but the presence of bacteria and biofilms can aggravate the degradation conditions and causes unexpected problems. Critical infrastructures and metallic components with very long service life may be susceptible to pitting corrosion: for example the metallic canisters and overpacks aimed to contain vitrified high-level radioactive waste (HLW) and spent nuclear fuel and to confine them in a water-tight envelope for several tens of thousands years in deep geologic repositories.

== Corrosion inhibitors ==
Different types of corrosion inhibitor exist. Among them, oxidizing species such as chromate (CrO^{2−}_{4}) and nitrite (NO^{−}_{2}) were the first used to re-establish the state of passivation in the protective oxide layer. In the specific case of steel, the Fe^{2+} cation being a relatively soluble species, it contributes to favor the dissolution of the oxide layer which so loses its passivity. To restore the passivity, the principle simply consists to prevent the dissolution of the oxide layer by converting the soluble divalent Fe^{2+} cation into the much less soluble trivalent Fe^{3+} cation. This approach is also at the basis of the chromate conversion coating used to passivate steel, aluminium, zinc, cadmium, copper, silver, titanium, magnesium, and tin alloys.

As hexavalent chromate is a known carcinogen, its aqueous effluents can no longer be freely discharged into the environment and its maximum concentration acceptable in water is very low.

Nitrite is also an oxidizing species and has been used as corrosion inhibitor since the 1950's. Under the basic conditions prevailing in concrete pore water nitrite converts the relatively soluble Fe^{2+} ions into the much less soluble Fe^{3+} ions, and so protects the carbon-steel reinforcement bars by forming a new and denser layer of γ-Fe_{2}O_{3} as follows:

2 Fe^{2+} + 2 NO^{−}_{2} + 2 OH^{−} → Fe_{2}O_{3} + 2 NO + H_{2}O

Corrosion inhibitors, when present in sufficient amount, can provide protection against pitting. However, too low level of them can aggravate pitting by forming local anodes.

== Engineering failures due to pitting corrosion ==
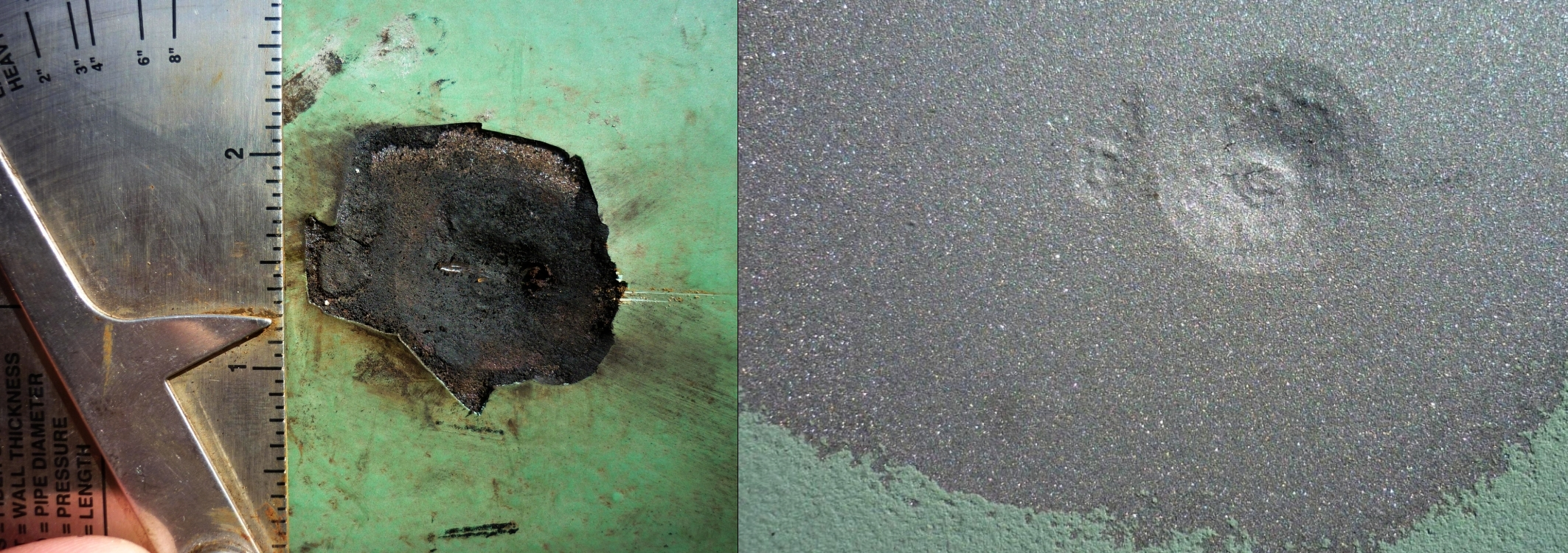
A corrosion pit on the outside wall of a pipeline at a coating defect before and after abrasive blasting.

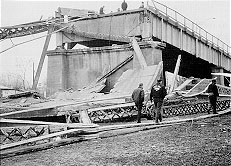
The Silver Bridge collapsed into the Ohio River as a result of stress corrosion cracking.

A single pit in a critical point can cause a great deal of damage. One example is the explosion in Guadalajara, Mexico, on 22 April 1992, when gasoline fumes accumulated in sewers destroyed kilometers of streets. The vapors originated from a leak of gasoline through a single hole formed by corrosion between a steel gasoline pipe and a zinc-plated water pipe.

Firearms can also suffer from pitting, most notably in the bore of the barrel when corrosive ammunition is used and the barrel is not cleaned soon afterwards. Deformities in the bore caused by pitting can greatly reduce the firearm's accuracy. To reduce pitting in firearm bores, most modern firearms have a bore lined with chromium.

Pitting corrosion can also help initiate stress corrosion cracking, as happened when a single eyebar on the Silver Bridge in West Virginia, United States, failed and killed 46 people on the bridge in December 1967.

In laboratories, pitting corrosion may damage equipment, reducing its performance or longevity. Fume hoods are of particular concern, as the material constitution of their ductwork must suit the primary effluent(s) intended for exhaust. If the chosen vent material is unsuitable for the primary effluent(s), consequent pitting corrosion will prevent the fume hood from effectively containing harmful airborne particles.

== See also ==
- Capillary electrophoresis (CE occurring in the pit)
- Concrete degradation#Chloride attack
- Corrosion
- Corrosion engineering
- Crevice corrosion
- Micro pitting
- Panel edge staining
- Pitting resistance equivalent number (PREN)
- Pourbaix diagram
- Point defect (point-defect model)
- Stress corrosion cracking (SCC)
- Sulfide stress cracking
- Transition metal chloride complex
- Transition metal thiosulfate complex
