= Faraday paradox (electrochemistry) =

Resolved paradox in electrochemistry

The Faraday paradox was a once inexplicable aspect of the reaction between nitric acid and steel. Around 1830, the English scientist Michael Faraday found that diluted nitric acid would attack steel, but concentrated nitric acid would not. The attempt to explain this discovery led to advances in electrochemistry.

Faraday's electrochemical paradox arises from his famous experiment of 1833. Concentrated nitric acid had been synthesized and although Faraday did not have a pH meter (the pH scale would not be developed for another seventy years), Faraday knew from various tests (e.g. taste and time of dissolution of calcite chips) that concentrated nitric acid was a much stronger acid than dilute nitric acid. Thus, when he placed the iron in the dilute acid, gas (now known to be hydrogen) was evolved from the surface and the iron dissolved. When he placed the iron in the concentrated nitric acid, he expected that it would dissolve at a higher rate, but no attack was observed. He then scratched the surface and a burst of bubbles was generated but then ceased. He stated that the surface had become "passive" and, therefore, he correctly assumed that the surface was oxidized and became covered with a protective oxide film. However, the oxide film did not dissolve and the attack did not continue in the concentrated nitric acid. This became known as Faraday's electrochemical paradox, and was not solved until 1989.

The paradox was resolved through the discovery of passivation. When the acid is concentrated enough, and because concentrated nitric acid is an oxidizing agent, the electrochemical potential of the metal is raised to the point that a layer of metastable Fe_{3}O_{4} forms on the surface and protects it from further corrosion, even though the pH is so low that stable Fe_{3}O_{4} cannot exist. This explanation is supported by the observation that scratching the surface causes a burst of bubbles. Diluted nitric acid is not as strong an oxidizing agent and hence does not raise the potential of the metal to the extent that metastable Fe_{3}O_{4} forms on the surface. In this case, the metal freely corrodes.
