= Pitting resistance equivalent number =

Predictive measurement of stainless steel resistance to localized pitting corrosion

Pitting resistance equivalent number (PREN) is a predictive measurement of a stainless steel's resistance to localized pitting corrosion based on its chemical composition. In general: the higher PREN-value, the more resistant is the stainless steel to localized pitting corrosion by chloride.

PREN is frequently specified when stainless steels will be exposed to seawater or other high chloride solutions. In some instances stainless steels with PREN-values > 32 may provide useful resistance to pitting corrosion in seawater, but is dependent on optimal conditions. However, crevice corrosion is also a significant possibility and a PREN > 40 is typically specified for seawater service.

These alloys need to be manufactured and heat treated correctly to be seawater corrosion resistant to the expected level. PREN alone is not an indicator of corrosion resistance. The value should be calculated for each heat to ensure compliance with minimum requirements, this is due to chemistry variation within the specified composition limits.

== PREN formulas (w/w) ==
There are several PREN formulas. They commonly range from:

PREN = %Cr + 3.3 × %Mo + 16 × %N

to:

PREN = %Cr + 3.3 × %Mo + 30 × %N.

There are a few stainless steels which add tungsten (W), for those the following formula is used:

PREN = %Cr + 3.3 × (%Mo + 0.5 × %W ) + 16 × %N

All % values of elements must be expressed by mass, or weight (wt. %), and not by volume. Tolerance on element measurements could be ignored as the PREN value is indicative only.

A number of online calculators are available to help you calculate PREN. As well as being practical, they are often accompanied by extensive technical documentation written by expert engineers in the field. Don't hesitate to consult them

== Pitting resistance measurement ==
Exact pitting test procedures are specified in the ASTM G48 standard.
