= Crevice corrosion =

Highly localized corrosion caused by a stagnant electrolyte in a crevice

Crevice corrosion refers to corrosion occurring in occluded spaces such as interstices in which a stagnant solution is trapped and not renewed. These spaces are generally called crevices. Examples of crevices are gaps and contact areas between parts, under gaskets or seals, inside cracks and seams, spaces filled with deposits and under sludge piles.

== Mechanism ==
The corrosion resistance of a stainless steel is dependent on the presence of an ultra-thin protective oxide film (passive film) on its surface, but it is possible under certain conditions for this oxide film to break down, for example in halide solutions or reducing acids. Areas where the oxide film can break down can also sometimes be the result of the way components are designed, for example under gaskets, in sharp re-entrant corners or associated with incomplete weld penetration or overlapping surfaces. These can all form crevices which can promote corrosion. To function as a corrosion site, a crevice has to be of sufficient width to permit entry of the corrodent, but narrow enough to ensure that the corrodent remains stagnant. Accordingly crevice corrosion usually occurs in gaps a few micrometres wide, and is not found in grooves or slots in which circulation of the corrodent is possible. This problem can often be overcome by paying attention to the design of the component, in particular to avoiding formation of crevices or at least keeping them as open as possible. Crevice corrosion is a very similar mechanism to pitting corrosion; alloys resistant to one are generally resistant to both. Crevice corrosion can be viewed as a less severe form of localized corrosion when compared with pitting. The depth of penetration and the rate of propagation in pitting corrosion are significantly greater than in crevice corrosion.

Crevices can develop a local chemistry which is very different from that of the bulk fluid. For example, in boilers, concentration of non-volatile impurities may occur in crevices near heat-transfer surfaces because of the continuous water vaporization. "Concentration factors" of many millions are not uncommon for common water impurities like sodium, sulfate or chloride ions. The concentration process is often referred to as "hideout" (HO), whereas the opposite process, whereby the concentrations tend to even out (e.g., during shutdown) is called "hideout return" (HOR). In a neutral pH solution, the pH inside the crevice can drop to 2, a highly acidic condition that accelerates the corrosion of most metals and alloys.

For a given crevice type, two factors are important in the initiation of crevice corrosion: the chemical composition of the electrolyte in the crevice and the electrical potential drop into the crevice. Researchers had previously claimed that either one or the other of the two factors was responsible for initiating crevice corrosion, but recently it has been shown that it is a combination of the two that causes active crevice corrosion. Both the drop of potential and the change in composition of the crevice electrolyte are produced by the oxygen depletion of the solution inside the crevice (oxygen consumption caused by the metal oxidation at the inner surface of the occluded cavity) and the separation of electroactive areas, with net anodic reactions (oxidation) occurring within the crevice and net cathodic reactions (reduction) occurring at the exterior of the crevice (on the bold surface). The ratio of the surface areas between the cathodic and anodic region is significant.

Some of the phenomena occurring within the crevice may be somewhat reminiscent of galvanic corrosion:

galvanic corrosion
two connected metals + single environment
crevice corrosion
one metal part + two connected environments

The mechanism of crevice corrosion can be (but is not always) similar to that of pitting corrosion. However, there are sufficient differences to warrant a separate treatment. For example, in crevice corrosion, one has to consider the geometry of the crevice and the nature of the concentration process leading to the development of the differential local chemistry. The extreme and often unexpected local chemistry conditions inside the crevice need to be considered. Galvanic effects can play a role in crevice degradation.

== Mode of attack ==
Depending on the environment developed in the crevice and the nature of the metal, the crevice corrosion can take a form of:

- pitting (i.e., formation of pits), but note pitting and crevice corrosion are not the same phenomenon,
- filiform corrosion (this type of crevice corrosion that may occur on a metallic surface underneath an organic coating),
- intergranular attack, or,
- stress corrosion cracking.

== Stress corrosion cracking ==
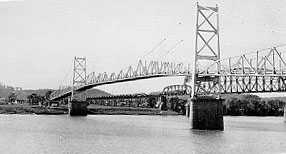
The Silver Bridge over the Ohio River, upon completion in 1928

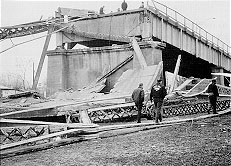
The collapsed Silver Bridge in 1967, after 39 years service life, as seen from the Ohio side

A common form of crevice failure occurs due to stress corrosion cracking, where a crack or cracks develop from the base of the crevice where the stress concentration is greatest. This was the root cause of the fall of the Silver Bridge over the Ohio River, in 1967 in West Virginia, where a single critical crack only about 3 mm long suddenly grew and fractured a tie bar joint. The rest of the bridge fell in less than a minute. The disaster was caused by one single point of failure (SPOF).

The eyebars in the Silver Bridge were not redundant, as links were composed of only two bars each, of high strength steel (more than twice as strong as common mild steel), rather than a thick stack of thinner bars of modest material strength "combed" together as is usual for redundancy. With only two bars, the failure of one could impose excessive loading on the second, causing total failure—unlikely if more bars are used. While a low-redundancy chain can be engineered to the design requirements, the safety is completely dependent upon correct, high quality manufacturing and assembly.

== Significance ==
The susceptibility to crevice corrosion varies widely from one material-environment system to another. In general, crevice corrosion is of greatest concern for materials which are normally passive metals, like stainless steel or aluminum. Crevice corrosion tends to be of greatest significance to components built of highly corrosion-resistant superalloys and operating with the purest-available water chemistry. For example, steam generators in nuclear power plants degrade largely by crevice corrosion.

In industrial piping systems, crevice corrosion is also a common damage mechanism at pipe supports and other "touch points". The narrow gap between a pipe and beams, saddles or clamps can trap water and contaminants, creating an oxygen-depleted crevice and localised external wall loss on the external pipe surface. In oil, gas and petrochemical facilities this is often referred to as corrosion under pipe supports (CUPS).

Crevice corrosion is extremely dangerous because it is localized and can lead to component failure while the overall material loss is minimal. The initiation and progress of crevice corrosion can be difficult to detect.

== See also ==
- Corrosion engineering
