= List of welding processes =

This is a list of welding processes, separated into their respective categories. The associated N reference numbers (second column) are specified in ISO 4063 (in the European Union published as EN ISO 4063). Numbers in parentheses are obsolete and were removed from the current (1998) version of ISO 4063. The AWS reference codes of the American Welding Society are commonly used in North America.

== Arc welding ==
Overview article: arc welding

Name	N	AWS	Characteristics	Applications
Bare Metal Arc Welding	(113)	BMAW	Consumable electrode, no flux or shielding gas	Historical
Carbon Arc Welding	(181)	CAW	Carbon electrode, historical	Copper, repair (limited)
Flux Cored Arc Welding	136; 138	FCAW; FCAW-S	Continuous consumable electrode filled with flux	Industry, construction
Gas Metal Arc Welding	131; 135	GMAW	Continuous consumable electrode and shielding gas	Industry
Gas Tungsten Arc Welding	141	GTAW	Nonconsumable electrode, slow, high quality welds	Aerospace, Construction (piping), Tool and Die
Plasma Arc Welding	15	PAW	Nonconsumable electrode, constricted arc	Tubing, instrumentation
Shielded Metal Arc Welding	111	SMAW	Consumable electrode covered in flux, can weld any metal as long as they have the right electrode	Construction, outdoors, maintenance
Submerged Arc Welding	121	SAW	Automatic, arc submerged in granular flux	
Magnetically Impelled Arc Butt Welding	185	MIAB	Both tube ends are electrodes; no protection gas; arc rotates fast along edge by applied magnetic field	Pipelines and tubes
Atomic Hydrogen Welding	(149)	AHW	Two metal electrodes in hydrogen atmosphere	Historical

== Oxyfuel gas welding ==
Overview article: Oxy-fuel welding and cutting

Name	N	AWS	Characteristics	Applications
Air acetylene welding	(321)	AAW	Chemical welding process, not popular	Limited
Oxyacetylene welding	311	OAW	Combustion of acetylene with oxygen produces high-temperature flame, inexpensive equipment	Maintenance, repair
Oxygen/Propane welding	312		Gas welding with oxygen/propane flame	
Oxyhydrogen welding	313	OHW	Combustion of hydrogen with oxygen produces flame	Limited
Pressure gas welding		PGW	Gas flames heat surfaces and pressure produces the weld	Pipe, railroad rails (limited)

== Resistance welding ==
Overview article: electric resistance welding

Name	N	AWS	Characteristics	Applications
Resistance spot welding	21	RSW	Two pointed electrodes apply pressure and current to two or more thin workpieces	Automobile industry, Aerospace industry
Resistance seam welding	22	RSEW	Two wheel-shaped electrodes roll along workpieces, applying pressure and current	Aerospace industry, steel drums, tubing
Projection welding	23	PW	Semi-Automatic, Automatic, Welds are localized at predetermined points.	
Flash welding	24	FW		
Upset welding	25	UW	Butt joint surfaces heated and brought together by force	

== Solid-state welding ==
Name	N	AWS	Characteristics	Applications
Coextrusion Welding		CEW	Dissimilar metals are extruded through the same die	Joining of corrosion resistant alloys to cheaper alloys or alloys with more favorable mechanical properties
Cold pressure welding	48	CW	Joining of soft alloys such as copper and aluminium below their melting point	Electrical contacts
Diffusion welding	45	DFW	No weld line visible	Titanium pump impellor wheels
Explosion welding	441	EXW	Joining of dissimilar materials, e.g. corrosion resistant alloys to structural steels	Transition joints for chemical industry and shipbuilding. Bimetal pipelines
Electromagnetic pulse welding			Tubes or sheets are accelerated by electromagnetic forces. Oxides are expelled during impact	Automotive industry, pressure vessels, dissimilar material joints
Forge welding	(43)	FOW	The oldest welding process in the world. Oxides must be removed by flux or flames.	Damascus steel
Friction welding	42	FRW	Thin heat affected zone, oxides disrupted by friction, needs sufficient pressure	Aerospace industry, railway, land transport
Friction stir welding	43	FSW	A rotating non-consumable tool is traversed along the joint line	Shipbuilding, aerospace, railway rolling stock, automotive industry
Friction stir spot welding		FSSW	A rotating non-consumable tool is plunged into overlapping sheets	Automotive industry
Hot pressure welding		HPW	Metals are pressed together at elevated temperatures below the melting point in vacuum or an inert gas atmosphere	Aerospace components
Hot isostatic pressure welding	47	HPW	A hot inert gas applies the pressure inside a pressure vessel, i.e. an autoclave	Aerospace components
Roll welding		ROW	Bimetallic materials are joined by forcing them between two rotating wheels	Dissimilar materials
Ultrasonic welding	41	USW	High-frequency vibratory energy is applied to foils, thin metal sheets or plastics.	Solar industries-. Electronics. Rear lights of cars. Diapers.

== Other types of welding ==
Name	N	AWS	Characteristics	Applications
Electron beam welding	51; 511	EBW	Deep penetration, fast, high equipment cost	
Electroslag welding	72	ESW	Welds thick workpieces quickly, vertical position, steel only, continuous consumable electrode	Heavy plate fabrication, construction, shipbuilding
Flow welding (previously cast welding)			Distortion is minimized, and the thermal cycle is relatively benign.	Joining rails in situ by liquid metal
Induction welding	74	IW		
Laser beam welding	521; 522	LBW	Deep penetration, fast, high equipment cost	Automotive industry
Laser-hybrid welding			Combines LBW with GMAW in the same welding head, able to bridge gaps up to 2mm (between plates), previously not possible with LBW alone.	Automotive, Shipbuilding, Steelwork industries
Percussion welding	77	PEW	Following an electrical discharge, pressure is applied which forges the materials together	Components of switch gear devices
Thermite welding	71	TW	Exothermic reaction between aluminium powder and iron oxide powder	Railway tracks
Electrogas welding	73		Continuous consumable electrode, vertical positioning, steel only	Storage tanks, shipbuilding
Stud arc welding	78		Welds studs to base material with heat and pressure	

== Notes and references ==
- Cary, Howard B. and Scott C. Helzer (2005). Modern Welding Technology. Upper Saddle River, New Jersey: Pearson Education. ISBN 0-13-113029-3.
- Lincoln Electric (1994). The Procedure Handbook of Arc Welding. Cleveland: Lincoln Electric. ISBN 99949-25-82-2.

== See also ==
- Welding
- List of welding codes
- Symbols and conventions used in welding documentation
- Laser cladding
