= 2013 Mayflower oil spill =

Environmental disaster in Arkansas, United States

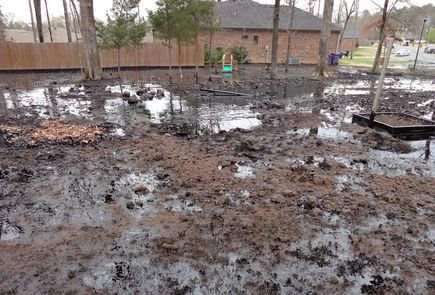
- Interactive map of 2013 Mayflower oil spill
- Location: Mayflower, Arkansas
- Coordinates: 34°57′50.9″N 92°25′42.3″W
- Date: March 29, 2013

Cause
- Cause: Pipeline rupture
- Operator: ExxonMobil

Spill characteristics
- Volume: 3,190 bbl (134,000 US gal; 507 m^{3})

The 2013 Mayflower oil spill occurred on March 29, 2013, when the Pegasus Pipeline, owned by ExxonMobil and carrying Canadian Wabasca heavy crude from the Athabasca oil sands, ruptured in Mayflower, Arkansas, about 25 miles (40 km) northwest of Little Rock releasing about 3,190 barrels (134,000 US gal; 507 m^{3}) of oil. Approximately 3,190 barrels (134,000 US gal; 507 m^{3}) of oil and water mix was recovered. Twenty-two homes were evacuated. The United States Environmental Protection Agency (EPA) classified the leak as a major spill.

Exxon's Pegasus pipeline carries 95,000 barrels per day (15,100 m^{3}/d) of crude a distance of 850 miles (1,368 km) from Patoka, Illinois to Nederland, Texas. On April 2, 2013, PHMSA, the federal pipeline regulator, issued a corrective action order until repairs have been completed and all safety concerns addressed.

== Pegasus Pipeline ==
Pegasus Pipeline running through Texas, Arkansas, Missouri, and Illinois

The Pegasus Pipeline, (a/k/a, EMPCO Pipeline, and the Magnolia Pipeline) is 858 miles (1,381 km), and runs from Patoka IL to the Texas Gulf Coast. It was built in two segments between 1947-1954 as an oil pipeline, which shipped products from Corsicana Texas, both north for industrial uses, and south to Gulf Coast refineries.

The flow of the southern section was reversed in 1995, and again in 2002. The northern section was abandoned in 2002, before being re-commissioned in 2005-2006 and reversed to carry diluted bitumen from Alberta Tar Sands to refiners in Texas.

The pipeline sheet metal was manufactured by Youngstown Sheet & Tube Co, using a manufacturing process called LF-ERW (Low-Frequency Electric Resistance Welds). This process has been known to have latent defects which eventually leads to failures. Pipeline and Hazardous Materials Safety Administration issued advisory bulletins in 1988 and 1989 to alert operators of factors contributing to failures of pipelines constructed with ERW pipe.

== Substance spilled ==
There has been some controversy over the exact nature of the substance spilled in Mayflower. On April 5, the Environmental Protection Agency sent a request for more information about Wabasca Heavy—the oil that spilled on the Pegasus line on March 29. The EPA's question was: "Can the oil accurately be described as oil sands oil, or a type of diluted bitumen (dilbit)?" In his response on April 10, Richard Byrne, Exxon's assistant chief attorney of environmental and safety law stated: "Canadian producers report their production of Wabasca Heavy as bitumen." This contradicts statements by company officials that the substance spilled was simply "heavy oil," not oil sands bitumen. However, the Material Safety Data Sheet for the product confirms that the Wabasca Heavy is bitumen mixed with hydrocarbon diluents.

== Response ==
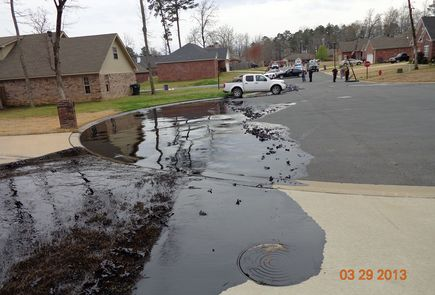
Diluted bitumen flows along suburban street

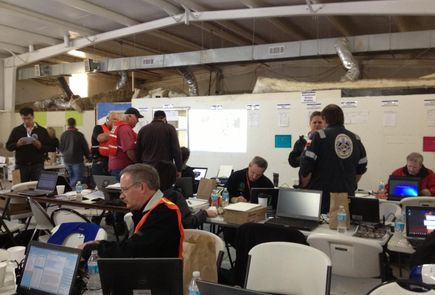
Coordination of spill response

Early images from local media showed crude oil running along a suburban street and across lawns. The pipeline was shut after the leak was discovered on March 29. Twenty-two homes were evacuated. The oil flowed into storm drains leading to nearby Lake Conway, a fishing lake. First responders, including fire fighters, city employees, county road crews and police built dikes to block culverts and stop the crude from fouling the lake. ExxonMobil deployed 3,600 feet (1,100 m) of containment boom around the lake. ExxonMobil said that by early morning on March 30 there was no more oil spilling from the pipeline and trucks were there to assist with the cleanup. Residents of the homes evacuated were allowed to temporarily return to their homes escorted by police to retrieve personal items. ExxonMobil set up a claims hotline for affected residents. Officials from the EPA and the Pipeline and Hazardous Materials Safety Administration (PHMSA) initiated an investigation of the spill.

There have been varying estimates of how much crude spilled. Initially ExxonMobil did not state an exact amount. On March 30, the company reported that 4,500 barrels (190,000 US gal; 720 m^{3}) of oil and water mix had been recovered. The following day the company said 12,000 barrels (500,000 US gal; 1,900 m^{3}) of oil and water had been recovered. The company was unable to estimate how much of the total was oil and how much water. On April 10, UPI reported that around 5,000 barrels (210,000 US gal; 790 m^{3}) of oil were spilled but quoted Exxon as saying that the final volume would not be known until after the pipeline was repaired and refilled. Before determination of the penalties for the violations of federal and state environmental laws, the estimated amount was corrected to 3,190 barrels (134,000 US gal; 507 m^{3}).

On April 1, 2013, the Federal Aviation Administration announced it was closing the airspace from the ground to 1,000 feet (300 m) over the disaster area; the restriction spanned a 5-mile (8.0 km) radius. The Arkansas Democrat-Gazette reported that the FAA's restriction stated "only relief aircraft operations under direction of Tom Suhrhoff" were permitted to enter the designated airspace. Surhrhoff was identified as an "aviation advisor" to ExxonMobil. On April 3 the FAA changed the restriction level to allow media access stating the media should not have been restricted from this type of incident, also claiming FAA was responsible for the error. The flight restrictions over Mayflower were cancelled on April 5.

On April 2, PHMSA issued a corrective action order to ExxonMobil Pipeline Co. preventing ExxonMobil from restarting operations on the affected segment of the pipeline until it is satisfied with repairs and all safety concerns have been addressed. According to the order: "continued operation of the Pegasus Pipeline would be hazardous to life, property, and the environment." Arkansas' Attorney General Dustin McDaniel promised a state investigation into the cause and impact of the spill. In a letter to ExxonMobil McDaniel stated: "There are many questions and concerns remaining as to the long-term impacts, environmental or otherwise, from this spill," He asked ExxonMobil to preserve records pending his investigation.

For several days after the spill, local residents complained about the "horrible smell" of the diluted bitumen. Air quality monitoring has been conducted by the EPA and ExxonMobil and posted online by the Arkansas Department of Environmental Quality. According to Fox 16 News, the air quality readings have been reviewed by the Arkansas Department of Health and are below levels that will cause health effects for the general population except in cleanup areas where emergency responders are working.

On April 10, Attorney General McDaniel hired disaster management firm Witt O'Brien's to analyze the cleanup process.

== Effects ==
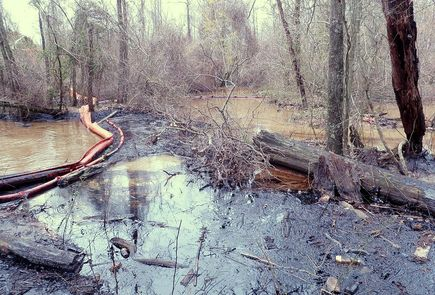
Diluted bitumen flows into creek

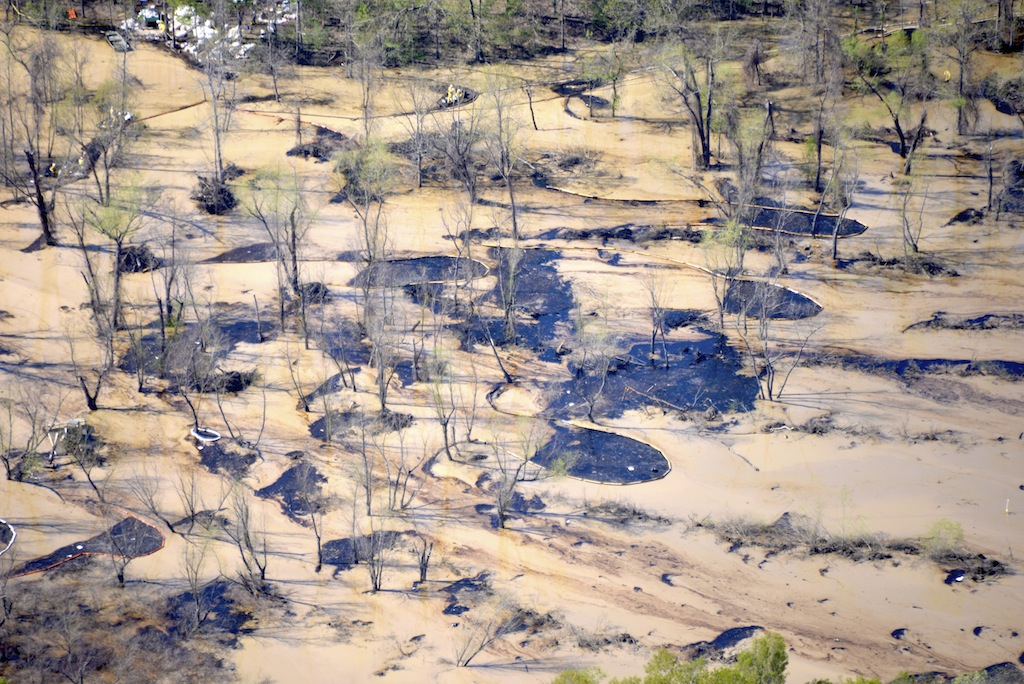
Diluted bitumen flows into wetlands east of I-40 by On Wings of Care

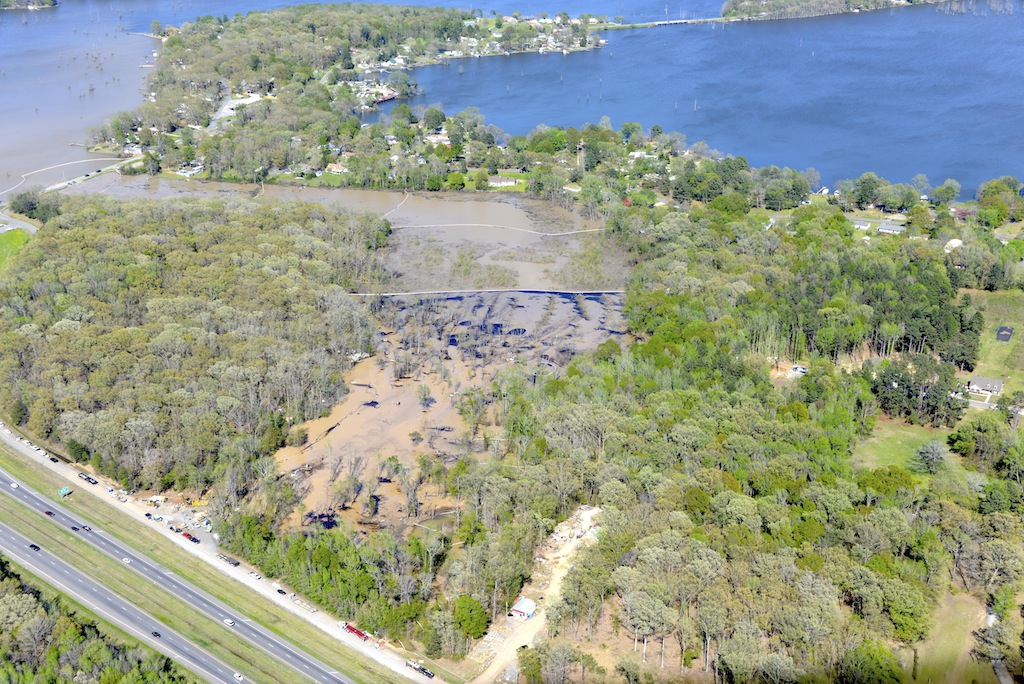
Boom placed around marshes and into Lake Conway On Wings of Care

Members of the community have been engaged in gathering and spreading information about what happened due to the lack of media coverage about the event.

=== Water ===
Since the spill on March 29, there have been conflicting reports as to whether the oil sands oil has reached Lake Conway. Official reports have indicated that there is no oil in Lake Conway, but an independent study claims to have samples showing oil in the water column. Scott Smith of Opflex, an oil clean-up company, states that official samples are of surface water only: “Exxon and the EPA are taking instantaneous water samples, grab samples from the surface. Obviously if the contaminants in oil sands oil, and chemicals, are in the water column beneath the surface you’re not going to get any of those molecules to test.” Keith Stephens of Arkansas Game and Fish has countered these findings, pointing out that there have been no dead fish or other wildlife that would indicate that there is oil in the main body of the lake.

=== Air quality ===
While initial reports of air quality by the Arkansas Department of Health did not reveal levels that were of concern for health effects, monitoring by a citizens group has revealed significant readings of toxic chemicals. According to a representative of the Sierra Club: "Total toxic hydrocarbons were detected at more than 88,000 parts per billion in the ambient air." Exxon reported detecting benzene and other harmful chemicals in early sampling at Mayflower but said air and water quality was within safe limits. However, the report, released by the Faulkner Citizens Advisory Group, said residents were still showing symptoms of exposure to harmful chemicals, including benzene and toluene, more than four weeks after the spill.

== Relationship to Keystone XL ==
One of the issues highlighted in national news coverage is the relationship to the Keystone XL Pipeline that has been proposed to carry oil from Canada's oil sands to refineries on the US Gulf Coast. An article in the National Geographic News states: "Now, the broken conduit is at the center of a national debate—the plan to transport much larger volumes of heavy oil from the Canadian oil sands through the United States, through both older pipelines like Pegasus and new ones like the proposed Keystone XL." A Reuters article quotes Representative Ed Markey, a Massachusetts Democrat as saying: "Whether it's the proposed Keystone XL pipeline, or ... (the) mess in Arkansas, Americans are realizing that transporting large amounts of this corrosive and polluting fuel is a bad deal for American taxpayers and for our environment." The article notes that a report from the Canadian Energy Pipeline Association, put together by oil and gas consultancy Penspen, argues that "diluted bitumen is no more corrosive than other heavy crude." This latter claim has not been verified by independent peer-reviewed research and is the subject of a current study by the National Academy of Sciences.

== Investigative journalism ==
On July 22, 2013, InsideClimate News and the Arkansas Times announced that a crowdfunding initiative had amassed over $25,000 to fund two reporters to investigate the causes and consequences of the spill. Inside Climate News noted that ExxonMobil had not yet explained the cause of the 22-foot-long (7 m) gash in the pipeline, nor stated how much oil had been spilled. The oil company has maintained that the results of an inspection it conducted of the pipeline are not available to the public. The Inside Climate News article stated: "That leaves two critical questions unanswered: Did Exxon manage and test its broken Pegasus pipeline according to established guidelines? And, if it did, is the Arkansas accident a warning that other pipelines might be at risk?"

The two reporters chosen for this assignment are Elizabeth McGowan and Sam Elfing. McGowan was part of the InsideClimate News team that won the 2013 Pulitzer Prize for National Reporting for its coverage of the 2010 Kalamazoo River oil spill. Eifling is an Arkansas native who has written for a variety of publications, including Slate and the Columbia Journalism Review.

== Legal action ==
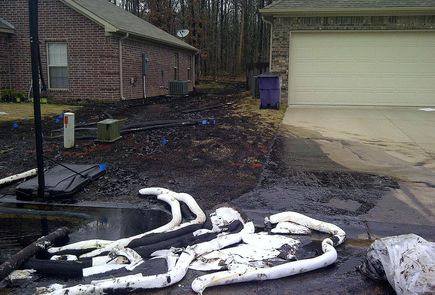
Damage to house

Residents of Mayflower are seeking payment from ExxonMobil for the environmental damage caused by the spill. By initiating action, they've forced the state and federal governments to file a lawsuit against the company. According to Arkansas Attorney General Dustin McDaniel, the lawsuit came quickly—within three months after the spill—but he said that the governments were forced to act. Citizens may file suits in lieu of the government, if the government won't act. A threatened lawsuit from displaced residents forced the state and federal government to file suit, or lose the opportunity. "We had 60 days to either resolve our claims or be masters of our own ship and, certainly, I think that the Department of Justice and the State Attorney General’s office have a responsibility to litigate on behalf of the governments of the state and the federal government rather than abdicating that to private lawyers," McDaniel said. Commenting about ExxonMobil, McDaneil added: "I think that they have done a really good job with response and cleanup, but then they break the law when they store the stuff that they removed from the site." The company had stored materials, including soil, water, concrete and wood chips, in large barrels at a company-owned site nearby. Arkansas officials had not granted permission to store hazardous material and have ordered the company to stop immediately.

According to Fox 16 News, local residents banded together on April 5, 2013 and April 8, 2013 at a "Mayflower Oil Spill Town Meeting hosted by Johnson & Vines Attorneys" to discuss their legal rights. Since that time, in addition to the State action file by the Attorney General, a mass action has been filed by two law firms in Arkansas state court in Faulkner County, Arkansas: Johnson & Vines (member of the American Injury Attorney Group) and partnering firm, Hare, Wynn, Newell & Newton.

In 2015, ExxonMobil settled charges that it violated the federal Clean Water Act and state environmental laws, for $5.07 million, including $4.19 million in civil penalties. It did not admit liability.

== Findings ==
Several problems with the pipe seam were identified as the cause of the failure. Hook cracks, extremely low impact toughness, and elongation properties were named for the pipe tested. The low-frequency electric resistance weld (ERW) pipe manufacturing process, used to make this pipe, has been known to have weaknesses with hook cracks and hardness issues.

== See also ==
- List of oil spills
- List of pipeline accidents in the United States
