= Percussion welding =

Percussion welding (PEW) is an arc welding process. The heat is obtained from an electric arc produced by short discharge of electrical energy while a percussive force is applied following the discharge. The heat generated by the discharge melts a thin area of metal on the faces of the work-pieces, and as the work-pieces are impacted they fuse to form a welded joint.

== History ==
The joining of small aluminum wires has always presented much difficulty on account of the oxide film which prevents the metal parts from flowing together, unless brought to a point of fluidity at which the oxide film can be broken up and washed away. If this be attempted with small sections, the whole mass is likely to be oxidized, and the resulting joint will be brittle or “crumbly.” In 1905 Lewis W. Chubb, of the Westinghouse Electric and Manufacturing Co., Pittsburgh, Penn., discovered that if two pieces of wire were connected to the terminals of a charged condenser, and then brought together with some force, that enough electrical energy would be concentrated at the point of contact to melt the wires, while the force of the blow would weld them together. Accordingly, a welding process was developed and used by the Westinghouse company, and machines made which were capable of welding all kinds of wire up to No. 13 gauge. The process was called electro-percussive welding.

There is some degree of ambiguity regarding the definition of the percussion welding process. To quote the Welding Handbook: "The term percussive, or percussion welding, has of late years been abused by applying it to certain types of welds made with very short timing."

== Process ==
The electrical energy for the percussion welding can be supplied by a transformer, as alternating current (or rectified), or by the discharge of capacitors. Because of the short duration of the arc and of the fact that all of the weld energy comes from this arc, the electrical resistance of the parts to be welded does not affect the amount of heat generated at the weld and substances of entirely dissimilar characteristics can be readily welded as, for instance, stainless steel to aluminum and copper. The metal solidifies almost instantly after the fusion of the parts with minimal oxidation. No flux or shielding gas are required.

The most common application of percussion welding is joining small cross section item like wires and small diameter rods, but is used as well for larger parts welding. The welding force is applied by electromagnets, springs, pneumatic pistons, gravity and other. The work-pieces must approach each other in a short time; the speed is typically 0.5 to 3 m/sec. The whole process is completed in a few milliseconds. The electrical discharge should be initiated before the parts, or the full area of the parts, come in contact. The two techniques used are nib initiated discharge or high voltage discharge.

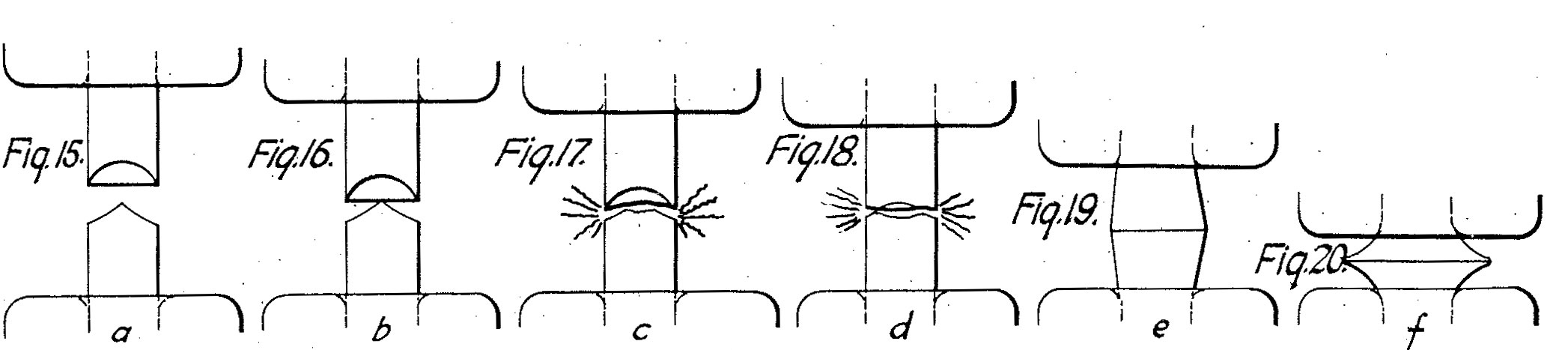
Nib percussion welding sequence. US patent 1,066,468

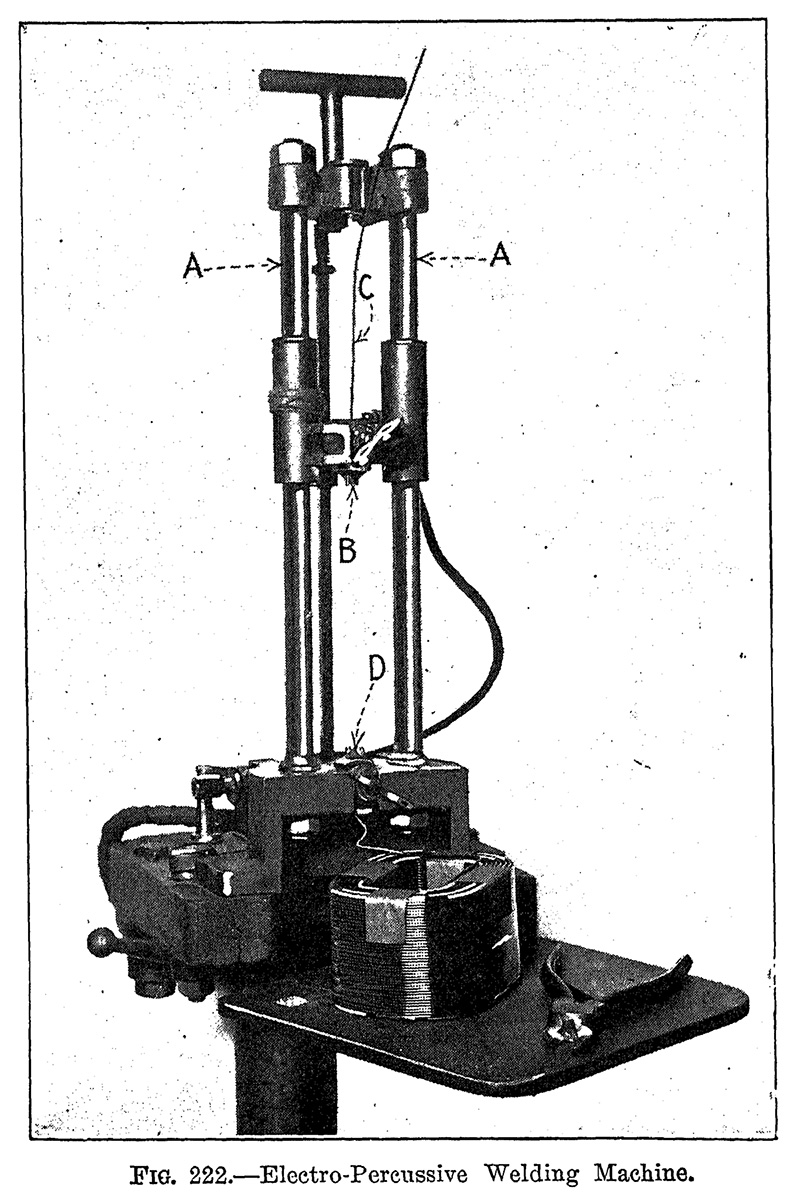
Electro-percussive welding machine. Westinghouse Company, about 1915

=== Nib initiated welding ===
Nib – a thin and sharp projection at the tip of one of the pats – is forming the initial contact and is initiating the full discharge. Historically this was the first form of percussive welding patented in 1913 by Lewis W. Chubb. This process is still in use today, especially in stud welding. Nib initiated welding can use alternating current supplied by a transformer, or capacitors charged by direct current.

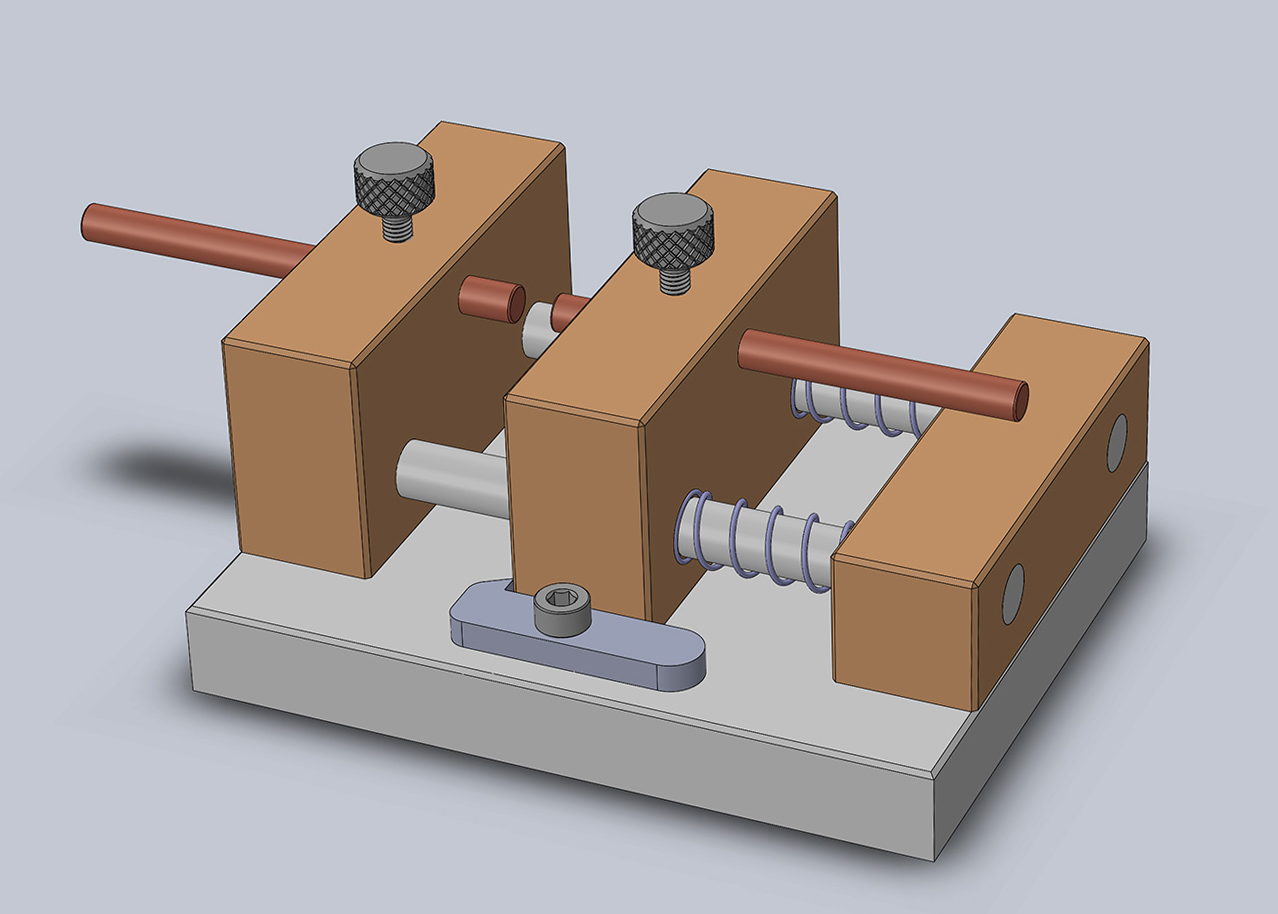
One form of percussion welding fixture

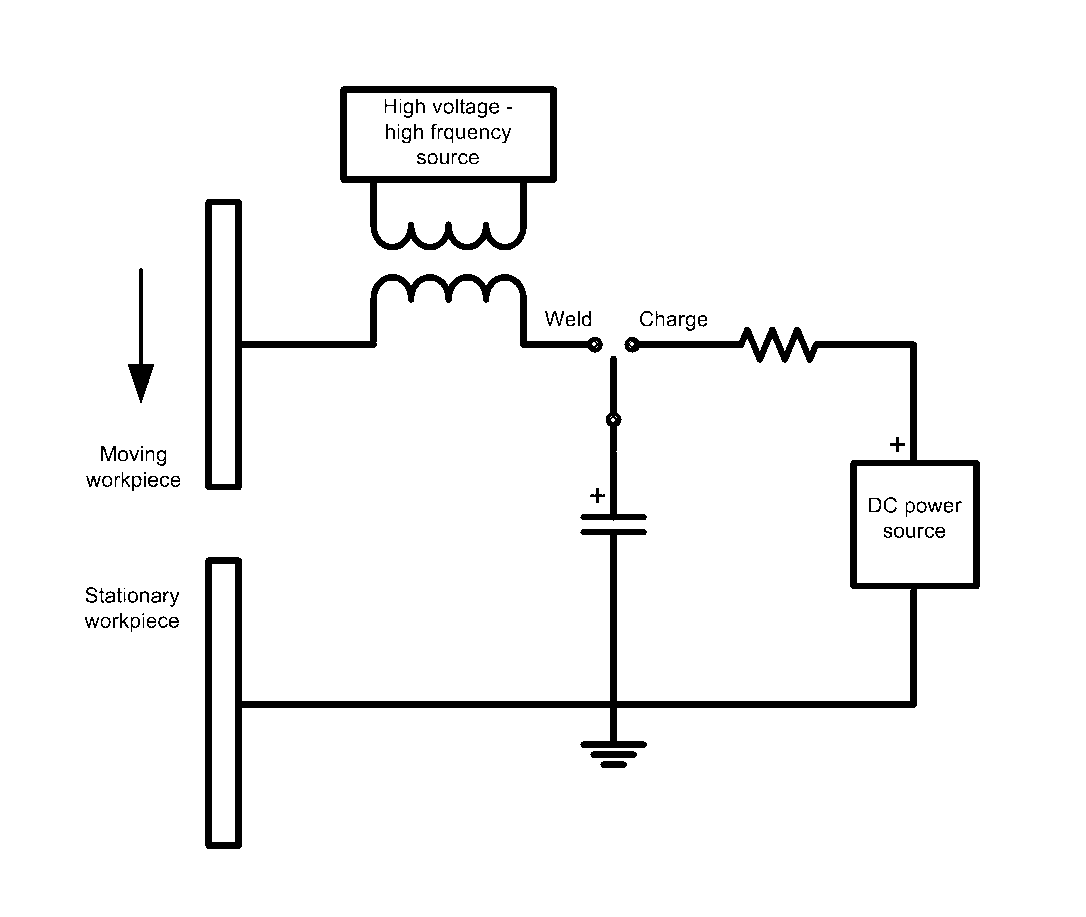
Low voltage percussion welding with high frequency arc start

=== Electrical discharge initiated welding ===
High voltage percussion welding - with the high voltage supplied by a capacitor or capacitor bank - is often used for smaller parts. As the work-pieces are approaching each other and shortly before contact, the air gap between the pieces becomes sufficiently small to cause a discharge. This gap is typically in the order of 0.5 to 2mm and the voltages used are typically 1 to 5 kV. Lower voltages, in the range of 50V to 150V, can be used with a high frequency arc start. The high voltage, high frequency current is superimposed on the lower capacitor voltage. Once the arc is initiated in the gap, the ionized air becomes conductive triggering the discharge of the capacitor.

== See also ==
1. Welding
2. Flash welding
3. Spot welding
4. Upset welding
5. Gas tungsten arc welding
