= Low-frequency electric resistance weld =

Low-frequency electric resistance weld, LF-ERW is Electric resistance welded (ERW) pipe manufactured by cold-forming a sheet of steel into a cylindrical shape. Current is then passed between the two edges of the steel to heat the steel to a point at which the edges are forced together to form a bond without the use of welding filler material. Initially this manufacturing process used low frequency A.C. current to heat the edges. This low frequency process was used from the 1920s until 1970. In 1970, the low frequency process was superseded by a high frequency ERW process which produced a higher quality weld.

Over time, the welds of low frequency ERW pipe was found to be susceptible to selective seam corrosion, hook cracks, and inadequate bonding of the seams, so low frequency ERW is no longer used to manufacture pipe. The high frequency process is still being used to manufacture pipe for use in new pipeline construction.

The Poplar Pipeline was built in the 1950s using pipe made with low-frequency electric resistance welds as was the Pegasus Pipeline.

== Poplar Pipeline ==
On January 19, 2015 oil from a broken pipeline seeped into the Yellowstone River, and contaminated the water supply 10 miles south of Glendive, Montana. The release was from Bridger Pipeline LLC's 12-inch Poplar line, which can carry 42,000 barrels a day of crude from the Bakken Formation and runs from Canada south to Baker, Montana. Bridger Pipeline is a subsidiary of True Cos., a privately held Wyoming-based company. The company said in a statement that the pipeline was shut down within an hour of the leak.

== Pegasus Pipeline ==
The 2013 Mayflower oil spill occurred when ExxonMobil's 20-inch Pegasus crude oil pipeline spilled near Mayflower, Arkansas on March 29, causing crude to flow through yards and gutters, and towards Lake Conway. Wildlife was coated in some places. Twenty-two homes were evacuated, due to the fumes and fire hazard. Some estimates say the total amount spilled could reach upwards of 300,000 gallons diluted bitumen were spilled. Hook cracks and extremely low impact toughness in the LF-ERW seam were identified as causes of the failure.
