= Upset welding =

Electric resistance welding technique

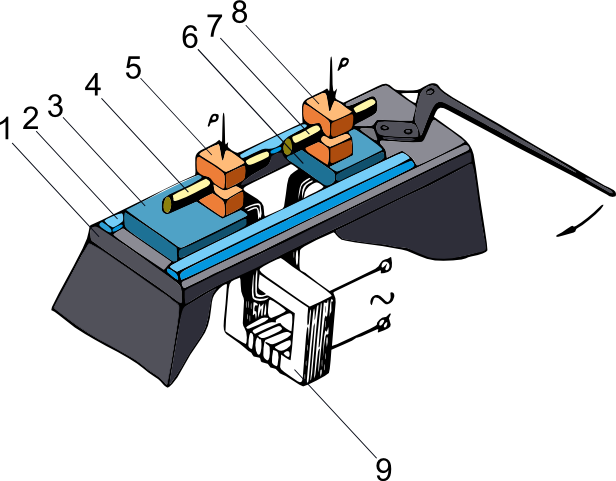
upset(butt)welding machine

Upset welding, or resistance butt welding, is a welding technique that produces coalescence simultaneously over the entire area of abutting surfaces or progressively along a joint, by the heat obtained from resistance to electric current through the area where those surfaces are in contact.

Pressure is applied before heating is started and is maintained throughout the heating period. The equipment used for upset welding is very similar to that used for flash welding. It can be used only if the parts to be welded are equal in cross-sectional area. The abutting surfaces must be very carefully prepared to provide for proper heating. The difference from flash welding is that the parts are clamped in the welding machine and force is applied bringing them tightly together. High-amperage current is then passed through the joint, which heats the abutting surfaces. When they have been heated to a suitable forging temperature an upsetting force is applied and the current is stopped. The high temperature of the work at the abutting surfaces plus the high pressure causes coalescence to take place. After cooling, the force is released and the weld is completed.

== See also ==
1. Welding
2. Flash welding
3. Spot welding
4. Percussion welding
5. Gas tungsten arc welding
