= Electric resistance welding =

Welding by passing electric current through work pieces

Electric resistance welding (ERW) is a welding process in which metal parts in contact are permanently joined by heating them with an electric current, melting the metal at the joint. Electric resistance welding is widely used, for example, in manufacture of steel pipe and in assembly of bodies for automobiles. The electric current can be supplied to electrodes that also apply clamping pressure, or may be induced by an external magnetic field. The electric resistance welding process can be further classified by the geometry of the weld and the method of applying pressure to the joint: spot welding, seam welding, flash welding, projection welding, for example. Some factors influencing heat or welding temperatures are the proportions of the workpieces, the metal coating or the lack of coating, the electrode materials, electrode geometry, electrode pressing force, electric current and length of welding time. Small pools of molten metal are formed at the point of most electrical resistance (the connecting or "faying" surfaces) as an electric current (100–100,000 A) is passed through the metal. In general, resistance welding methods are efficient and cause little pollution, but their applications are limited to relatively thin materials.

== Spot welding ==
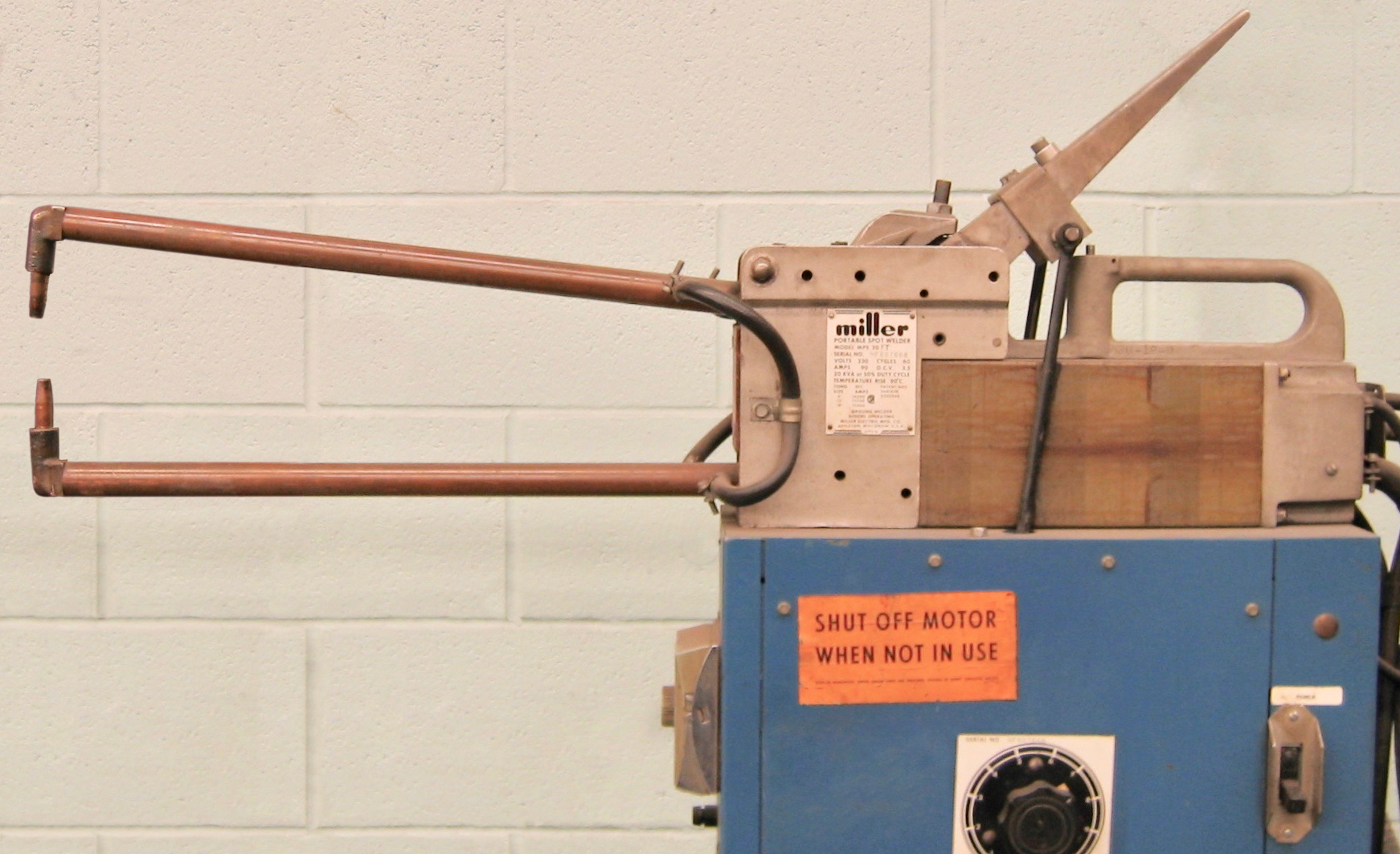
Spot welder

Spot welding is a resistance welding method used to join two or more overlapping metal sheets, studs, projections, electrical wiring hangers, some heat exchanger fins, and some tubing. Usually power sources and welding equipment are sized to the specific thickness and material being welded together. The thickness is limited by the output of the welding power source and thus the equipment range due to the current required for each application. Care is taken to eliminate contaminants between the faying surfaces. Usually, two copper electrodes are simultaneously used to clamp the metal sheets together and to pass current through the sheets. When the current is passed through the electrodes to the sheets, heat is generated due to the higher electrical resistance where the surfaces contact each other. As the electrical resistance of the material causes a heat buildup in the work pieces between the copper electrodes, the rising temperature causes a rising resistance, and results in a molten pool contained most of the time between the electrodes. As the heat dissipates throughout the workpiece in less than a second (resistance welding time is generally programmed as a quantity of AC cycles or milliseconds) the molten or plastic state grows to meet the welding tips. When the current is stopped the copper tips cool the spot weld, causing the metal to solidify under pressure. The water cooled copper electrodes remove the surface heat quickly, accelerating the solidification of the metal, since copper is an excellent conductor. Resistance spot welding typically employs electrical power in the form of direct current, alternating current, medium frequency half-wave direct current, or high-frequency half wave direct current.

If excessive heat is applied or applied too quickly, or if the force between the base materials is too low, or the coating is too thick or too conductive, then the molten area may extend to the exterior of the work pieces, escaping the containment force of the electrodes (often up to 30,000 psi). This burst of molten metal is called expulsion, and when this occurs the metal will be thinner and have less strength than a weld with no expulsion. The common method of checking a weld's quality is a peel test. An alternative test is the restrained tensile test, which is much more difficult to perform, and requires calibrated equipment. Because both tests are destructive in nature (resulting in the loss of salable material), non-destructive methods such as ultrasound evaluation are in various states of early adoption by many OEMs.

The advantages of the method include efficient energy use, limited workpiece deformation, high production rates, easy automation, and no required filler materials. When high strength in shear is needed, spot welding is used in preference to more costly mechanical fastening, such as riveting. While the shear strength of each weld is high, the fact that the weld spots do not form a continuous seam means that the overall strength is often significantly lower than with other welding methods, limiting the usefulness of the process. It is used extensively in the automotive industry – cars can have several thousand spot welds. A specialized process, called shot welding, can be used to spot weld stainless steel.

There are three basic types of resistance welding bonds: solid state, fusion, and reflow braze. In a solid state bond, also called a thermo-compression bond, dissimilar materials with dissimilar grain structure, e.g. molybdenum to tungsten, are joined using a very short heating time, high weld energy, and high force. There is little melting and minimum grain growth, but a definite bond and grain interface. Thus the materials actually bond while still in the solid state. The bonded materials typically exhibit excellent shear and tensile strength, but poor peel strength. In a fusion bond, either similar or dissimilar materials with similar grain structures are heated to the melting point (liquid state) of both. The subsequent cooling and combination of the materials forms a “nugget” alloy of the two materials with larger grain growth. Typically, high weld energies at either short or long weld times, depending on physical characteristics, are used to produce fusion bonds. The bonded materials usually exhibit excellent tensile, peel and shear strengths. In a reflow braze bond, a resistance heating of a low temperature brazing material, such as gold or solder, is used to join either dissimilar materials or widely varied thick/thin material combinations. The brazing material must “wet” to each part and possess a lower melting point than the two workpieces. The resultant bond has definite interfaces with minimum grain growth. Typically the process requires a longer (2 to 100 ms) heating time at low weld energy. The resultant bond exhibits excellent tensile strength, but poor peel and shear strength.

== Seam welding ==
Resistance seam welding is a process that produces a weld at the faying surfaces of two similar metals. The seam may be a butt joint or an overlap joint and is usually an automated process. It differs from flash welding in that flash welding typically welds the entire joint at once and seam welding forms the weld progressively, starting at one end. Like spot welding, seam welding relies on two electrodes, usually made from copper, to apply pressure and current. The electrodes are often disc shaped and rotate as the material passes between them. This allows the electrodes to stay in constant contact with the material to make long continuous welds. The electrodes may also move or assist the movement of the material.

A transformer supplies energy to the weld joint in the form of low voltage, high current AC power. The joint of the work piece has high electrical resistance relative to the rest of the circuit and is heated to its melting point by the current. The semi-molten surfaces are pressed together by the welding pressure that creates a fusion bond, resulting in a uniformly welded structure. Most seam welders use water cooling through the electrode, transformer and controller assemblies due to the heat generated.

Seam welding produces an extremely durable weld because the joint is forged due to the heat and pressure applied. A properly welded joint formed by resistance welding can easily be stronger than the material from which it is formed.

A common use of seam welding is during the manufacture of round or rectangular steel tubing. Seam welding has been used to manufacture steel beverage cans but is no longer used for this as modern beverage cans are primarily seamless aluminum with a glued and curled radial joint.

There are two modes for seam welding: Intermittent and continuous. In intermittent seam welding, the wheels advance to the desired position and stop to make each weld. This process continues until the desired length of the weld is reached. In continuous seam welding, the wheels continue to roll as each weld is made.

== Low-frequency electric resistance welding ==
Low-frequency electric resistance welding (LF-ERW) is an obsolete method of welding seams in oil and gas pipelines. It was phased out in the 1970s but as of 2015 some pipelines built with this method remained in service.

Electric resistance welded (ERW) pipe is manufactured by cold-forming a sheet of steel into a cylindrical shape. Current is then passed between the two edges of the steel to heat the steel to a point at which the edges are forced together to form a bond without the use of welding filler material. Initially this manufacturing process used low frequency AC current to heat the edges. This low frequency process was used from the 1920s until 1970. In 1970, the low frequency process was superseded by a high frequency ERW process which produced a higher quality weld.

Over time, the welds of low frequency ERW pipe were found to be susceptible to selective seam corrosion, hook cracks, and inadequate bonding of the seams, so low frequency ERW is no longer used to manufacture pipe. The high frequency process is still being used to manufacture pipe for use in new pipeline construction.

== Other methods ==
Other ERW methods include flash welding, resistance projection welding, and upset welding.

Flash welding is a type of resistance welding that does not use any filler metals. The pieces of metal to be welded are set apart at a predetermined distance based on material thickness, material composition, and desired properties of the finished weld. Current is applied to the metal, and the gap between the two pieces creates resistance and produces the arc required to melt the metal. Once the pieces of metal reach the proper temperature, they are pressed together, effectively forge welding them together.

Projection welding is a modification of spot welding in which the weld is localized by means of raised sections, or projections, on one or both of the workpieces to be joined. Heat is concentrated at the projections, which permits the welding of heavier sections or the closer spacing of welds. The projections can also serve as a means of positioning the workpieces. Projection welding is often used to weld studs, nuts, and other threaded machine parts to metal plate. It is also frequently used to join crossed wires and bars. This is another high-production process, and multiple projection welds can be arranged by suitable designing and jigging.

== See also ==
- List of welding processes
- Shot welding
