= Argon oxygen decarburization =

Process in stainless steel making

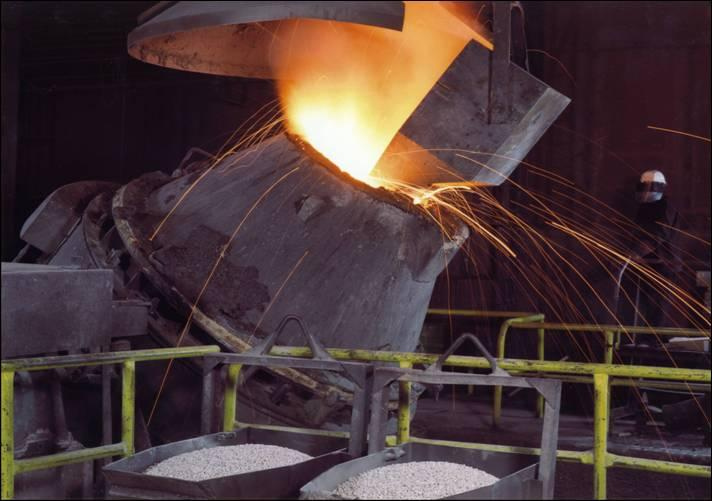
Refining of a 9.5%CrMoWVNbN steel in an argon, oxygen decarburisation (AOD) vessel

Argon Oxygen Decarburization (AOD) is a process primarily used in stainless steel making and other high grade alloys with oxidizable elements such as chromium and aluminium. After initial melting the metal is then transferred to an AOD vessel where it will be subjected to three steps of refining; decarburization, reduction, and desulfurization.

The AOD process was invented in 1954 by the Lindé Division of The Union Carbide Corporation (which became known as Praxair in 1992).

== Process ==
The AOD process is usually divided in three main steps: decarburization, reduction, and desulfurization.

=== Decarburization ===
Prior to the decarburization step, one more step should be taken into consideration: de-siliconization, which is a very important factor for refractory lining and further refinement.

The decarburization step is controlled by ratios of oxygen to argon or nitrogen to remove the carbon from the metal bath. The ratios can be done in any number of phases to facilitate the reaction. The gases are usually blown through a top lance (oxygen only) and tuyeres in the sides/bottom (oxygen with an inert gas shroud). The stages of blowing remove carbon by the combination of oxygen and carbon forming CO gas.

4 Cr_{(bath)} + 3 O_{2} → 2 Cr_{2}O_{3(slag)}

Cr_{2}O_{3(slag)} + 3 C_{(bath)} → 3 CO_{(gas)} + 2 Cr_{(bath)}

To drive the reaction to the forming of CO, the partial pressure of CO is lowered using argon or nitrogen. Since the AOD vessel is not externally heated, the blowing stages are also used for temperature control. The burning of carbon increases the bath temperature. By the end of this process around 97% of Cr is retained in the steel.

=== Reduction ===
After a desired carbon and temperature level have been reached the process moves to reduction. Reduction recovers the oxidized elements such as chromium from the slag. To achieve this, alloy additions are made with elements that have a higher affinity for oxygen than chromium, using either a silicon alloy or aluminium. The reduction mix also includes lime (CaO) and fluorspar (CaF_{2}). The addition of lime and fluorspar help with driving the reduction of Cr_{2}O_{3} and managing the slag, keeping the slag fluid and its volume small.

=== Desulfurization ===
Desulfurization is achieved by having a high lime concentration in the slag and a low oxygen activity in the metal bath.

S_{(bath)} + CaO_{(slag)} → CaS_{(slag)} + O_{(bath)}

So, additions of lime are added to dilute sulfur in the metal bath. Also, aluminium or silicon may be added to remove oxygen. Other trimming alloy additions might be added at the end of the step. After sulfur levels have been achieved the slag is removed from the AOD vessel and the metal bath is ready for tapping. The tapped bath is then either sent to a stir station for further chemistry trimming or to a caster for casting.

The desulfurization step is usually the first step of the process.

== History ==
The AOD process has a significant place in the history of steelmaking, introducing a transformative method for refining stainless steel and shaping the industry's landscape.

=== 1960s ===
The development of AOD technology began in the 1960s as an alternative to traditional steelmaking methods. The process was initially introduced by American chemical companies who aimed to refine stainless steel more efficiently and economically.

=== Late 1960s ===
In the late 1960s, the AOD process gained recognition for its ability to remove carbon efficiently, achieving lower carbon levels than other refining methods. It also offered the advantage of being able to produce stainless steel with low carbon content, making it suitable for various applications.

=== 1970s ===
During the 1970s, the AOD process underwent further refinements and improvements. Steel companies in Europe and the United States increasingly adopted the AOD method in their operations, attracted by its flexibility and ability to produce high-quality stainless steel.

=== 1980s ===
In the 1980s, the AOD process became widely accepted as a standard refining method for stainless steel worldwide. Its advantages, such as high metallic yields, precise control over chemical composition, carbon control, desulfurization capabilities, and cleaner metal production, contributed to its popularity.

=== Present Day ===
Today, the AOD process remains a prominent method in the stainless steel industry. It offers steelmakers greater flexibility in raw material selection, enabling the use of cost-effective inputs and ensuring accurate and consistent results.The process has also contributed to increased production capacity with relatively small capital investments compared to conventional electric furnace methods.

== Additional uses ==
In additional to its primary application in the production of stainless steel, many various additional uses have been found for AOD across different industries and materials.

=== Carbon Capture and Utilization ===
AOD slag has shown promising potential for usage as a carbon-capture construction material due to its high capacity for CO_{2} and its low cost. Carbonation curing, a process utilizing CO_{2} as a curing agent in concrete manufacturing, enhances the chemical properties of stainless steel slag by stabilizing it. During carbonation, g-C_{2}S (di-calcium silicate) in the slag reacts with CO_{2} to produce compounds like calcite and silica gel, resulting in increased compressive strength and improved durability of cementitious materials. The incorporation of AOD slag as a replacement material in ordinary Portland cement (OPC) during carbonation curing has been studied, demonstrating positive effects on strength and reduced porosity.

=== Cementitious Activity and Modifiers ===
AOD slag exhibits cementitious activity, but its properties can be changed by modifiers. Studies have focused on the impact of modifiers, such as B_{2}O_{3} and P_{2}O_{5} on preventing the crystal transition of β-C2S and improving the cementitious activity of the slag. Addition of B_{2}O_{3} and P_{2}O_{5} has shown curing effects and increased compressive strength. These findings suggest that proper selection of modifiers can enhance the performance of stainless steel slag in cementitious applications.

=== Chromium Leachability and Carbonation ===
Another aspect of AOD slag research is its carbonation potential and its impact on chromium leachability. Carbonation of the dicalcium silicate in AOD slag leads to the formation of various compounds, including amorphous calcium carbonate, crystalline calcite, and silica gel. The carbonation ratio of the slag affects the mineral phases, which subsequently influence chromium leachability. Optimal carbonation ratios have been identified to minimize chromium leaching risks during carbonation-related production activities.
