= Nitronic =

Stainless steel alloy trade name

Nitronic is the trade name for a collection of nitrogen-strengthened stainless steel alloys. They are austenitic stainless steels.

== History ==
Nitronic alloys were developed by Armco Steel. The first of these alloys, Nitronic 40, was introduced in 1961. Since 2022, the trademark has been owned by Cleveland-Cliffs Steel Corp., successor to AK Steel. Electralloy is the licensed producer in North America for a wide range of Nitronic products.

The Nitronic name is due to the addition of nitrogen to the alloy, which enhances the strength internally rather than being nitrided on the surface, as some steel are treated. The nitrogen is homogeneous throughout the material. Nitronic materials have about twice the yield strength of 304L and 316L.

== Uses ==
Nitronic 30 is used to lighten transportation vehicles. Buses and railcars benefit from the high strength-to-weight ratio for weight savings. Nitronic 40 is used at cryogenic temperatures. and in the aerospace industry as hydraulic tubing. Nitronic 50 is used in marine environments, including boat shafting and solid rod rigging. Nitronic 60 and a similar alloy Gall-Tough have high resistance to galling, a form of wear caused by adhesion between sliding surfaces, and metal-to-metal wear.

== Composition ==
Nitronic alloys have widely varying compositions, but all are predominantly iron, chromium, manganese and nitrogen.

NITRONIC	Element (% by mass)											
NITRONIC	Fe	Cr	Ni	Mo	Nb	Mn	Si	C	S	P	V	N
30 UNS S20400	Bal	15.0–17.0	1.5–3.0			7.0–9.0	1 max	0.03 max	0.03 max	0.04 max		0.15–0.3
32 UNS S24100	Bal	16.5–19.0	0.5–2.5			11.–14.0	1 max	0.15 max		0.045 max		0.2–0.45
33 UNS S24000	Bal	17.0–19.0	2.3–3.7			11.5–14.5	0.75 max	0.08 max	0.01 max	0.06 max		0.–0.4
40 UNS S21900	Bal	19–21.5	5.5–7.5			8.0–10.0	1 max	0.04 max	0.01 max	0.04 max		0.2–0.4
50 UNS S20910	Bal	20.5–23.5	11.5–13.5	1.5–3.0	0.01–0.03	4.0–6.0	0.2–0.6	0.03 max	0.01 max	0.04 max	0.1–0.03	0.2–0.4
60 UNS S21800	Bal	16–17	8.0–8.5	0.75 max	0.10 max	7.5–8.5	3.7–4.2	0.06–0.08	0.03 max	0.040 max	0.2 max	0.1–0.18
