= Stud welding =

Form of spot welding

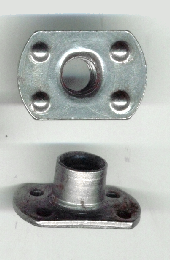
Slab base weld nuts

Stud welding is a technique similar to flash welding where a fastener or specially formed nut is welded onto another metal part, typically a base metal or substrate. The fastener can take different forms, but typically fall under threaded, unthreaded, or tapped. The bolts may be automatically fed into the stud welder. Weld nuts generally have a flange with small nubs that melt to form the weld. Weld studs are used in stud welding systems. Manufacturers create weld studs for the two main forms of stud welding: capacitor discharge stud welding and drawn arc stud welding

== Drawn arc stud welding ==
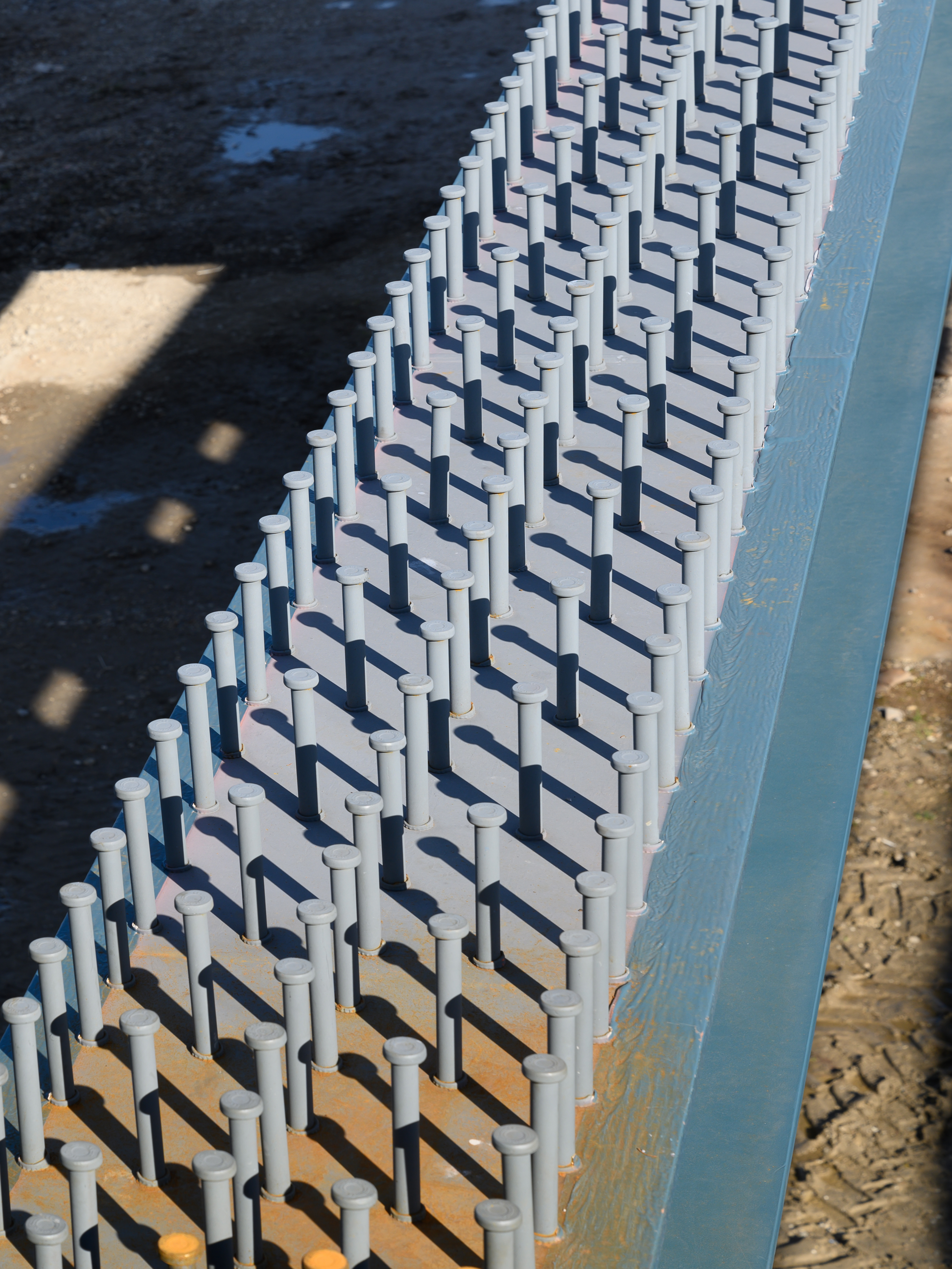
Stud-welded anchors on a bridge girder

Drawn arc stud welding joins a stud and another piece of metal together by heating both parts with an arc. The stud is usually joined to a flat plate by using the stud as one of the electrodes. The polarity used in stud welding depends on the type of metal being used. Welding aluminium, for example, would usually require direct-current electrode positive (DCEP). Welding steel would require direct-current electrode negative (DCEN).

Stud welding uses a flux tip and a ferrule, a ceramic ring which concentrates the heat, prevents oxidation and retains the molten metal in the weld zone. The ferrule is broken off the fastener after the weld is completed. This lack of marring on the side opposite the fastener is what differentiates stud welding from other fastening processes.

=== Drawn arc welding studs ===
Drawn arc studs range from a #8 to 1 1/4" diameter. The lengths are variable from 3/8" to 60" (for deformed bars). Arc studs are typically loaded with an aluminium flux ball on the weld end which aids in the welding process. Drawn arc weld studs are commonly made from mild steel and stainless steel.

=== Short cycle stud welding ===
Short cycle stud welding is a faster form of drawn arc stud welding which can use capacitor discharge weld studs instead of drawn arc studs. This method can tolerate welding studs to thinner sheet metals than the drawn arc process, though it does not achieve welds that are as strong or penetrative. It also does not require the use of ceramic ferrules. Sometimes operators using this process use shrouding gas to reduce spatter.

== Capacitor discharge stud welding ==
Capacitor discharge stud welding differs from drawn arc stud welding, in that capacitor discharge welding does not require flux. The weld time is shorter, enabling the weld to bond with little oxidation and no need for heat concentration. It also allows for small-diameter studs to be welded to thin, lightweight materials. This process uses a direct-current arc from a capacitor. The weld time in this process is between 1 and 6 milliseconds. Capacitor discharge stud welding with the latest equipment can create a weld without burn-through showing on the opposite side of very thin metals. CD stud welding is often used for smaller diameter studs and pins, as well as on non-standard materials and for accuracy. Drawn arc stud welding is primarily used for structural purposes and larger diameter weld studs.

=== Capacitor discharge weld studs ===
Capacitor discharge weld studs range from 14 gauge to 3/8" diameter. They come in many different lengths, ranging from 1/4" to 5" and larger. They are usually manufactured from mild or stainless steel, brass, aluminium, and aluminium alloy. The tip on the weld end of the stud serves a twofold purpose:

- It acts as a timing device to keep the stud off the base material.
- It disintegrates when the trigger is pulled on the gun.

When the tip disintegrates, it melts and helps solidify the weld to the base material.

== Automated and robotic stud welding ==
Portable stud welding machines are available. Welders can also be automated, with controls for arcing and applying pressure. CNC stud welding machines can increase the speed and accuracy of manufacturing and construction work. Stud welding is versatile; Typical applications include automobile bodies, electrical panels, shipbuilding and building construction. Shipbuilding is one of the oldest uses of stud welding, and the process revolutionized the shipbuilding industry. Other manufacturing industries can also use stud welding for a variety of purposes, from electrical and mechanical to decorative and consumer products.

== Standards ==
Among the standards quoted in the list of welding codes, the following apply:

- ISO 13918 - Welding - Studs and ceramic ferrules for arc stud welding
- ISO 14555 - Welding - Arc stud welding of metallic materials
