= Stainless steel =

Iron-based alloy resistant to rust and corrosion

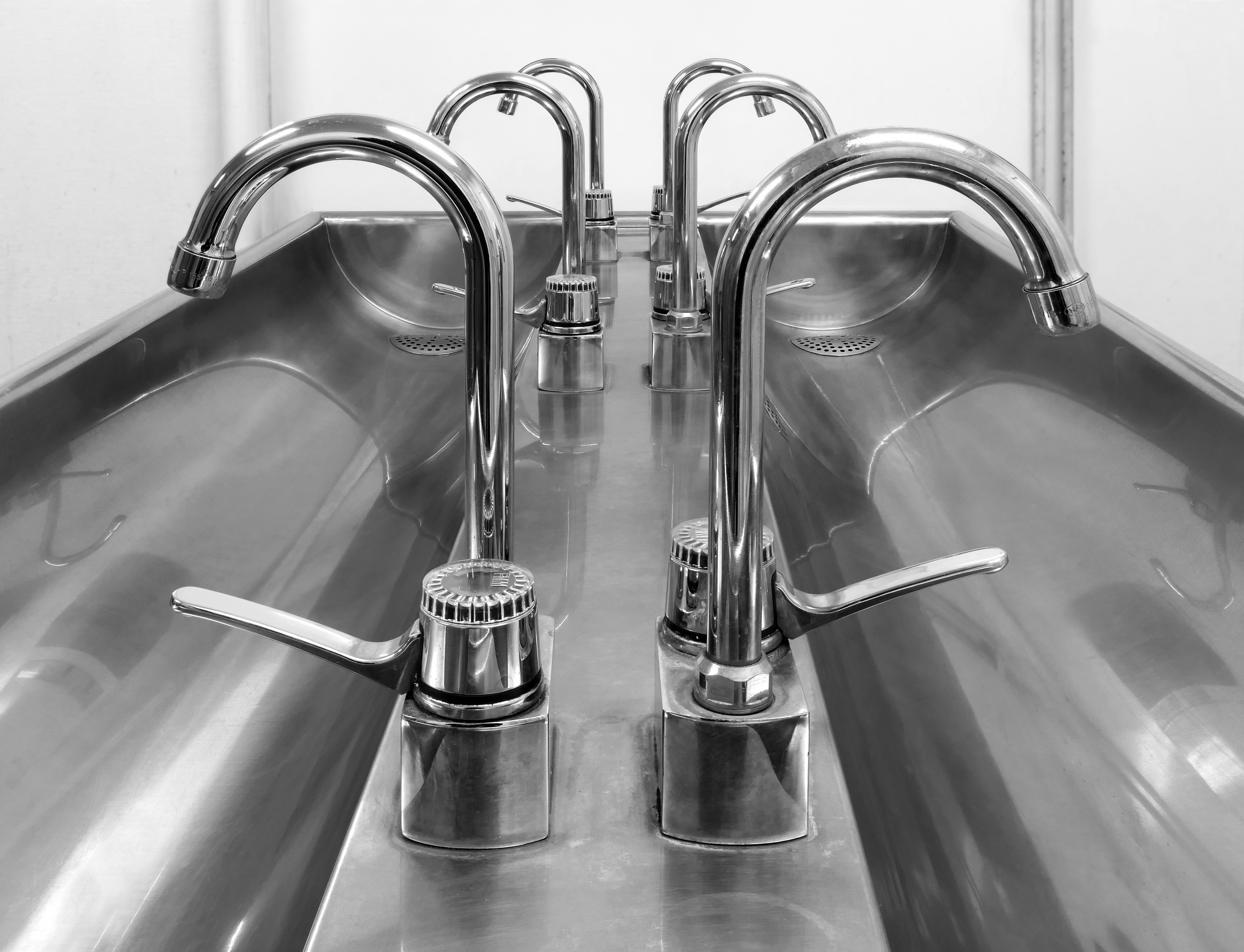
Stainless steel taps and sink

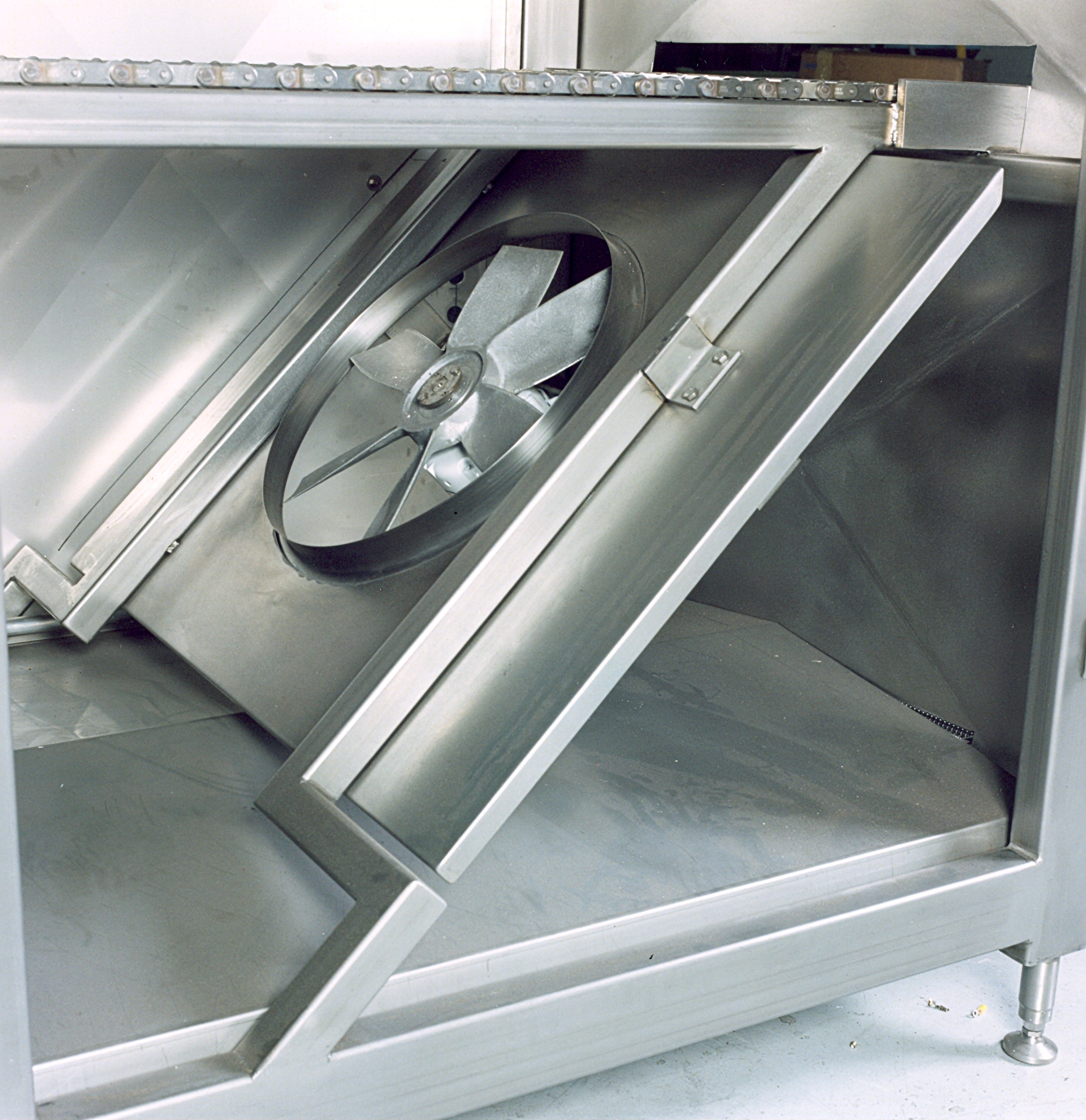
Stainless steel is used for industrial equipment when it is important that the equipment is durable and easy to clean.

Stainless steel is an iron-based alloy that contains chromium, making it resistant to rust and corrosion. Alternatively, it is known as inox (an abbreviation of the French term inoxydable, meaning non-oxidizable), corrosion-resistant steel (CRES), Nirosta (an abbreviation of the German term nichtrostender Stahl) or rustless steel. Stainless steel's resistance to corrosion comes from its chromium content of 10.5% or more, which forms a passive film that protects the material and can self-heal when exposed to oxygen. It can be further alloyed with elements like molybdenum, carbon, nickel and nitrogen to enhance specific properties for various applications.

The alloy's properties, such as luster and resistance to corrosion, are useful in many applications. Stainless steel can be rolled into sheets, plates, bars, wire, and tubing. These can be used in cookware, cutlery, surgical instruments, major appliances, vehicles, construction material in large buildings, industrial equipment (e.g., in paper mills, chemical plants, water treatment), and storage tanks and tankers for chemicals and food products. Some grades are also suitable for forging and casting.

The biological cleanability of stainless steel is superior to both copper and aluminium, and comparable to glass. Its cleanability, strength, and corrosion resistance have prompted the use of stainless steel in pharmaceutical and food processing plants.

Different types of stainless steel are labeled with an AISI three-digit number. The ISO 15510 standard lists the chemical compositions of stainless steels of the specifications in existing ISO, ASTM, EN, JIS, and GB standards in a useful interchange table.

== Properties ==
=== Corrosion resistance ===
Although stainless steel does rust, this only affects the outer few layers of atoms. Its chromium content shields deeper layers from oxidation.

The addition of nitrogen also improves resistance to pitting corrosion and increases mechanical strength. Stainless grades vary chromium and molybdenum contents to suit the environment the alloy must endure. Corrosion resistance can be increased further by the following means:

- increasing chromium content to more than 11%
- adding nickel to at least 8%
- adding molybdenum (which also improves resistance to pitting corrosion)
- Multi-layer protection, e.g., including both chromium oxide and manganese-based layers, which can withstand saltwater electrolysis at up to 1700 mV.

=== Strength ===
The most common type of stainless steel, 304, has a tensile yield strength around 210 MPa (30,000 psi) in the annealed condition. It can be strengthened by cold working to a strength of 1,050 MPa (153,000 psi) in the full-hard condition.

The strongest commonly available stainless steels are precipitation hardening alloys such as 17-4 PH and Custom 465. These can be heat treated to have tensile yield strengths up to 1,730 MPa (251,000 psi).

=== Melting point ===
The melting point of stainless steel ranges from 1,325 to 1,530 °C (2,417 to 2,786 °F), depending on the alloy, which is near that of ordinary steel, and much higher than aluminium or copper.

=== Conductivity ===
Like steel, stainless steels are relatively poor conductors of electricity, with significantly lower electrical conductivities than copper. In particular, the electrical contact resistance (ECR) of stainless steel arises as a result of the dense protective oxide layer and limits its functionality in applications as electrical connectors. Copper alloys and nickel-coated connectors tend to exhibit lower ECR values and are preferred materials for such applications. Nevertheless, stainless steel connectors are employed in situations where ECR poses a lower design criterion and corrosion resistance is required, for example in high temperatures and oxidizing environments.

=== Magnetism ===
Martensitic, duplex and ferritic stainless steels are magnetic, while austenitic stainless steel is usually non-magnetic. Ferritic steel owes its magnetism to its body-centered cubic crystal structure, in which iron atoms are arranged in cubes (with one iron atom at each corner) and an additional iron atom in the center. This central iron atom is responsible for ferritic steel's magnetic properties. This arrangement also limits the amount of carbon the steel can absorb to around 0.025%. Grades with low coercive field have been developed for electro-valves used in household appliances and for injection systems in internal combustion engines. Some applications require non-magnetic materials, such as magnetic resonance imaging. Austenitic stainless steels, which are usually non-magnetic, can be made slightly magnetic through work hardening. Sometimes, if austenitic steel is bent or cut, magnetism occurs along the edge of the stainless steel because the crystal structure rearranges itself.

Magnetic permeability of some austenitic stainless steel grades after annealing 2 hours at 1050 °C
EN grade	1.4307	1.4301	1.4404	1.4435
Magnetic permeability, μ	1.056	1.011	1.100	1.000

=== Wear ===
Galling, sometimes called cold welding, is a form of severe adhesive wear, which can occur when two metal surfaces are in relative motion to each other and under heavy pressure. Austenitic stainless steel fasteners are particularly susceptible to thread galling, though other alloys that self-generate a protective oxide surface film, such as aluminum and titanium, are also susceptible. Under high contact-force sliding, this oxide can be deformed, broken, and removed from parts of the component, exposing the bare reactive metal. When the two surfaces are of the same material, these exposed surfaces can easily fuse. Separation of the two surfaces can result in surface tearing and even complete seizure of metal components or fasteners. Galling can be mitigated by the use of dissimilar materials (bronze against stainless steel) or using different stainless steels (martensitic against austenitic). Additionally, threaded joints may be lubricated to provide a film between the two parts and prevent galling. Nitronic 60, made by selective alloying with manganese, silicon, and nitrogen, has demonstrated a reduced tendency to gall.

=== Density ===
The density of stainless steel ranges from 7.5 to 8.0 g/cm^{3} (0.27 to 0.29 lb/cu in) depending on the alloy.

== History ==
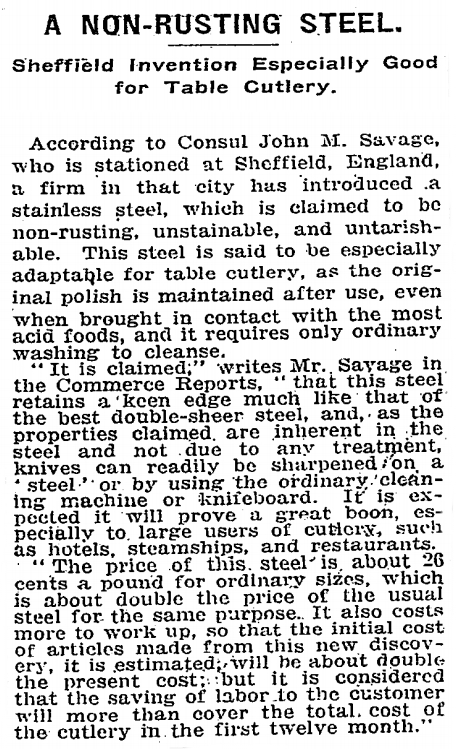
An announcement, as it appeared in a 1915 issue of The New York Times, of the development of stainless steel in Sheffield, England

The invention of stainless steel followed a series of scientific developments, starting in 1798 when chromium was first shown to the French Academy by Louis Vauquelin. In the early 1800s, British scientists James Stoddart, Michael Faraday, and Robert Mallet observed the resistance of chromium-iron alloys ("chromium steels") to oxidizing agents. Robert Bunsen discovered chromium's resistance to strong acids. The corrosion resistance of iron-chromium alloys may have been first recognized in 1821 by Pierre Berthier, who noted their resistance against attack by some acids and suggested their use in cutlery.

In the 1840s, both Britain's Sheffield steelmakers and then Krupp of Germany were producing chromium steel with the latter employing it for cannons in the 1850s. In 1861, Robert Forester Mushet took out a patent on chromium steel in Britain.

These events led to the first American production of chromium-containing steel by J. Baur of the Chrome Steel Works of Brooklyn for the construction of bridges. A US patent for the product was issued in 1869. (Note: Despite the evidence of the use of Baur's "chrome steel" in bridgeworks, others have argued that metallurgists of the 19th century were unable to produce anything but high-chromium alloys that were "too brittle to be practical".) This was followed with recognition of the corrosion resistance of chromium alloys by Englishmen John T. Woods and John Clark, who noted ranges of chromium from 5–30%, with added tungsten and "medium carbon". They pursued the commercial value of the innovation via a British patent for "Weather-Resistant Alloys".

Scientists researching steel corrosion in the second half of the 19th century didn't pay attention to the amount of carbon in the alloyed steels they were testing until in 1898 Adolphe Carnot and E. Goutal noted that chromium steels better resist to oxidation with acids the less carbon they contain.

Also in the late 1890s, German chemist Hans Goldschmidt developed an aluminothermic (thermite) process for producing carbon-free chromium. Between 1904 and 1911, several researchers, particularly Leon Guillet of France, prepared alloys that would later be considered stainless steel.

In 1908, the Essen firm Friedrich Krupp Germaniawerft built the 366-ton sailing yacht Germania featuring a chrome-nickel steel hull, in Germany. In 1911, Philip Monnartz reported on the relationship between chromium content and corrosion resistance. On 17 October 1912, Krupp engineers Benno Strauss and Eduard Maurer patented as Nirosta the austenitic stainless steel that became known as 18/8 or AISI type 304.

Similar developments were taking place in the United States, where Christian Dantsizen of General Electric and Frederick Becket (1875–1942) at Union Carbide were industrializing ferritic stainless steel. In 1912, Elwood Haynes applied for a US patent on a martensitic stainless steel alloy, which was not granted until 1919.

=== Harry Brearley ===
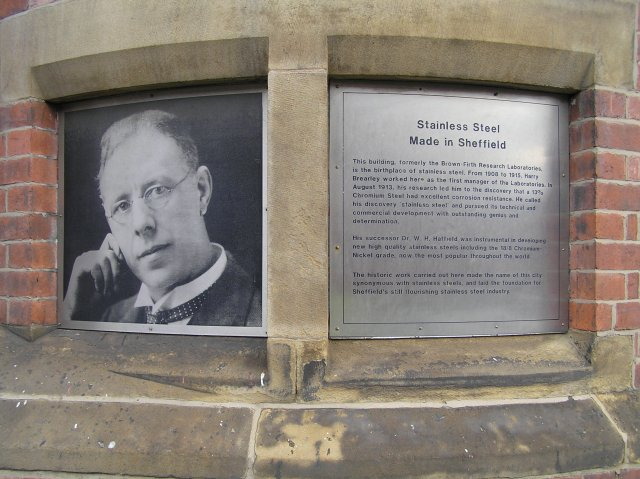
Monument to Harry Brearley at the former Brown Firth Research Laboratory in Sheffield, England

While seeking a corrosion-resistant alloy for gun barrels in 1913, Harry Brearley of the Brown-Firth research laboratory in Sheffield, England, discovered and subsequently industrialized a martensitic stainless steel alloy, later known as AISI type 420. The discovery was announced two years later in a January 1915 newspaper article in The New York Times.

The metal was later marketed under the "Staybrite" brand by Firth Vickers in England and was used for the new entrance canopy for the Savoy Hotel in London in 1929. Brearley applied for a US patent during 1915 only to find that Haynes had already registered one. Brearley and Haynes pooled their funding and, with a group of investors, formed the American Stainless Steel Corporation, with headquarters in Pittsburgh, Pennsylvania.

=== Rustless steel ===
Brearley initially called his new alloy "rustless steel". The alloy was sold in the US under different brand names like "Allegheny metal" and "Nirosta steel". Even within the metallurgy industry, the name remained unsettled; in 1921, one trade journal called it "unstainable steel".

Brearley worked with a local cutlery manufacturer, who gave it the name "stainless steel". As late as 1932, Ford Motor Company continued calling the alloy "rustless steel" in automobile promotional materials. However, stainless tended to predominate worldwide, and even in modern Japan, Western cutlery is simply referred to as "stainless (without "steel") spoon/fork" etc. [ステンレス: sutenresu].

In 1929, before the Great Depression, over 25,000 tons of stainless steel were manufactured and sold in the US annually.

Major technological advances in the 1950s and 1960s allowed the production of large tonnages at an affordable cost:

- AOD process (argon oxygen decarburization), for the removal of carbon and sulfur
- Continuous casting and hot strip rolling
- The Z-Mill, or Sendzimir cold rolling mill
- The Creusot-Loire Uddeholm (CLU) and related processes which use steam instead of some or all of the argon

== Families ==
Stainless steel is classified into five different "families" of alloys, each having a distinct set of attributes. Four of the families are defined by their predominant crystalline structure - the austenitic, ferritic, martensitic, and duplex alloys. The fifth family, precipitation hardening, is defined by the type of heat treatment used to develop its properties.

=== Austenitic ===
Austenitic stainless steel is the largest family of stainless steels, making up about two-thirds of all stainless steel production. They have a face-centered cubic crystal structure. This microstructure is achieved by alloying steel with sufficient nickel, manganese, or nitrogen to maintain an austenitic microstructure at all temperatures, ranging from the cryogenic region to the melting point. Thus, austenitic stainless steels are not hardenable by heat treatment since they possess the same microstructure at all temperatures.

Austenitic stainless steels consist of two subfamilies:

- 200 series are chromium-manganese-nickel alloys that maximize the use of manganese and nitrogen to minimize the use of nickel. Due to their nitrogen addition, they possess approximately 50% higher yield strength than 300-series stainless sheets of steel. Representative alloys include Type 201 and Type 202.
- 300 series are chromium-nickel alloys that achieve their austenitic microstructure almost exclusively by nickel alloying; some very highly alloyed grades include some nitrogen to reduce nickel requirements. 300 series is the largest group and the most widely used. Representative alloys include Type 304 and Type 316.

There are also austenitic stainless steels on the market outside of the common groups, such as UNS S21800 (alloy 218).

=== Ferritic ===
Ferritic stainless steels have a body-centered cubic crystal structure, are magnetic, and are hardenable by cold working, but not by heat treating. They contain between 10.5% and 27% chromium with very little or no nickel. Due to the near-absence of nickel, they are less expensive than austenitic stainless steels. Representative alloys include Type 409, Type 429, Type 430, and Type 446. Ferritic stainless steels are present in many products, which include:

- Automobile exhaust pipes
- Architectural and structural applications
- Building components, such as slate hooks, roofing, and chimney ducts
- Power plates in solid oxide fuel cells operating at temperatures around 700 °C (1,300 °F)

=== Martensitic ===
Martensitic stainless steels have a body-centered tetragonal crystal structure, are magnetic, and are hardenable by heat treating and by cold working. They offer a wide range of properties and are used as stainless engineering steels, stainless tool steels, and creep-resistant steels. They are not as corrosion-resistant as ferritic and austenitic stainless steels due to their low chromium content. They fall into four categories (with some overlap):

- Fe-Cr-C grades. These were the first grades used and are still widely used in engineering and wear-resistant applications. Representative grades include Type 410, Type 420, and Type 440C.
- Fe-Cr-Ni-C grades. Some carbon is replaced by nickel. They offer higher toughness and higher corrosion resistance. Representative grades include Type 431.
- Martensitic precipitation hardening grades. 17-4 PH (UNS S17400), the best-known grade, combines martensitic hardening and precipitation hardening to increase strength and toughness.
- Creep-resisting grades. Small additions of niobium, vanadium, boron, and cobalt increase the strength and creep resistance up to about 650 °C (1,200 °F).

Martensitic stainless steels can be heat treated to provide better mechanical properties. The heat treatment typically involves three steps:

1. Austenitizing, in which the steel is heated to a temperature in the range 980–1,050 °C (1,800–1,920 °F), depending on grade. The resulting austenite has a face-centered cubic crystal structure.
2. Quenching. The austenite is transformed into martensite, a hard body-centered tetragonal crystal structure. The quenched martensite is very hard and too brittle for most applications. Some residual austenite may remain.
3. Tempering. Martensite is heated to around 500 °C (930 °F), held at temperature, then air-cooled. Higher tempering temperatures decrease yield strength and ultimate tensile strength but increase the elongation and impact resistance.

=== Duplex ===
Duplex stainless steels have a mixed microstructure of austenite and ferrite, the ideal ratio being a 50:50 mix, though commercial alloys may have ratios of 40:60. They are characterized by higher chromium (19–32%) and molybdenum (up to 5%) and lower nickel contents than austenitic stainless steels. Duplex stainless steels have roughly twice the yield strength of austenitic stainless steel. Their mixed microstructure provides improved resistance to chloride stress corrosion cracking in comparison to austenitic stainless steel types 304 and 316. Duplex grades are usually divided into three sub-groups based on their corrosion resistance: lean duplex, standard duplex, and super duplex. The properties of duplex stainless steels are achieved with an overall lower alloy content than similar-performing super-austenitic grades, making their use cost-effective for many applications. The pulp and paper industry was one of the first to extensively use duplex stainless steel. The oil and gas industry became the largest user and has pushed for more corrosion resistant grades, leading to the development of super duplex and hyper duplex grades. More recently, the less expensive (and slightly less corrosion-resistant) lean duplex has been developed, chiefly for structural applications in building and construction (concrete reinforcing bars, plates for bridges, coastal works) and in the water industry.

=== Precipitation hardening ===
Precipitation hardening stainless steels are characterized by the ability to be precipitation hardened to higher strength. There are three types of precipitation hardening stainless steels which are classified according to their crystalline structure:

- Martensitic precipitation hardenable stainless steels are martensitic at room temperature in both the solution annealed and precipitation hardened conditions. Representative alloys include 17-4 PH (UNS S17400), 15-5 PH (UNS S15500), Custom 450 (UNS S45000) and Custom 465 (UNS S46500).
- Semi-austenitic precipitation hardenable stainless steels are initially austenitic in the solution annealed condition for ease of fabrication, but are subsequently transformed to martensite to provide higher strength and to be precipitation hardened. Representative alloys include 17-7 PH (UNS S17700), 15-7 PH (UNS S15700), AM-350 (UNS S35000), and AM-355 (UNS S35500).
- Austenitic precipitation hardenable stainless steels are austenitic at room temperature in both the solution annealed and precipitation hardened conditions. Representative alloys include A-286 (UNS S66286) and Discalloy (UNS S66220).

== Classification systems ==
Several different classification systems have been developed for designating stainless steels. The main system used in the United States has been the SAE steel grades numbering system. The SAE numbering system designates stainless steels by "Type" followed by a three-digit number and sometimes a letter suffix. A newer system that was jointly developed by ASTM and SAE in 1974 is The Unified Numbering System for Metals and Alloys (UNS). The Unified Numbering System classifies stainless steels using an alpha-numeric identifier consisting of "S" followed by five digits, although some austenitic stainless steels with high nickel content may fall into the nickel-base designation which uses "N" as the alpha identifier. The UNS designations incorporate previously used designations, whether from the SAE numbering system or proprietary alloy designations. Europe has adopted EN 10088 for classification of stainless steels.

== Corrosion resistance ==
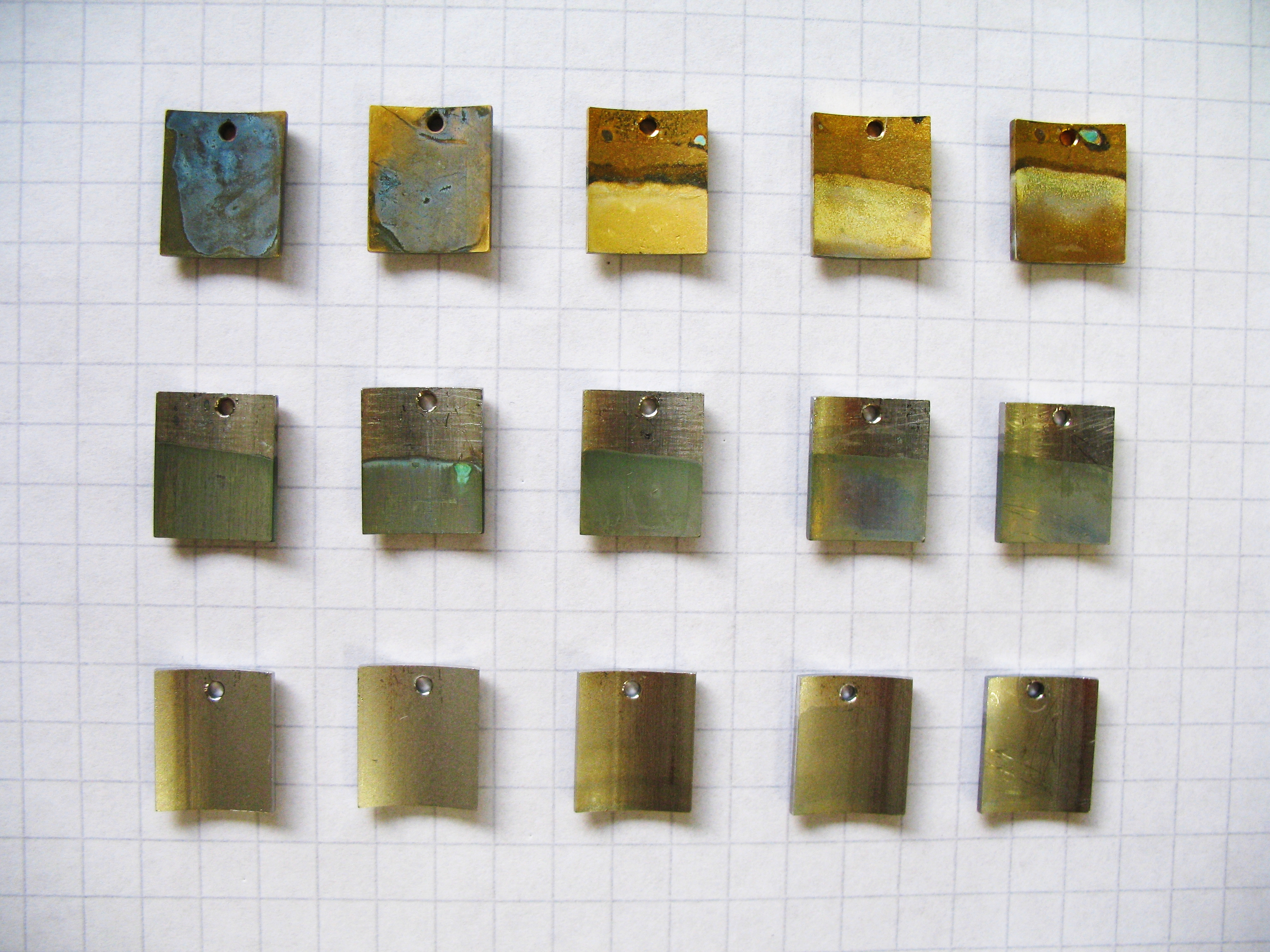
Stainless steel (bottom row) resists salt-water corrosion better than aluminium-bronze (top row) or copper-nickel alloys (middle row).

Unlike carbon steel, stainless steels do not suffer uniform corrosion when exposed to wet environments. Unprotected carbon steel rusts readily when exposed to a combination of air and moisture. The resulting iron oxide surface layer is porous and fragile. In addition, as iron oxide occupies a larger volume than the original steel, this layer expands and tends to flake and fall away, exposing the underlying steel to further attack. In comparison, stainless steels contain sufficient chromium to undergo passivation, spontaneously forming a microscopically thin inert surface film of chromium oxide by reaction with the oxygen in the air and even the small amount of dissolved oxygen in the water. This passive film prevents further corrosion by blocking oxygen diffusion to the steel surface and thus prevents corrosion from spreading into the bulk of the metal. This film is self-repairing, even when scratched or temporarily disturbed by conditions that exceed the inherent corrosion resistance of that grade.

The resistance of this film to corrosion depends upon the chemical composition of the stainless steel, chiefly the chromium content. It is customary to distinguish between four forms of corrosion: uniform, localized (pitting), galvanic, and SCC (stress corrosion cracking). Any of these forms of corrosion can occur when the grade of stainless steel is not suited for the working environment.

=== Uniform ===
Uniform corrosion takes place in very aggressive environments, typically where chemicals are produced or heavily used, such as in the pulp and paper industries. The entire surface of the steel is attacked, and the corrosion is expressed as corrosion rate in mm/year (usually less than 0.1 mm/year is acceptable for such cases). Corrosion tables provide guidelines.

This is typically the case when stainless steels are exposed to acidic or basic solutions. Whether stainless steel corrodes depends on the kind and concentration of acid or base and the solution temperature. Uniform corrosion is typically easy to avoid because of extensive published corrosion data or easily performed laboratory corrosion testing.

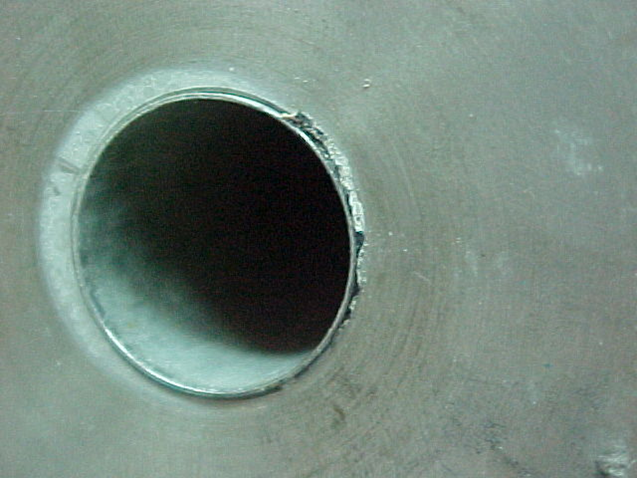
Stainless steel is not completely immune to corrosion, as shown in this desalination equipment.

Acidic solutions can be put into two general categories: reducing acids, such as hydrochloric acid and dilute sulfuric acid, and oxidizing acids, such as nitric acid and concentrated sulfuric acid. Increasing chromium and molybdenum content provides increased resistance to reducing acids while increasing chromium and silicon content provides increased resistance to oxidizing acids. Sulfuric acid is one of the most-produced industrial chemicals. At room temperature, type 304 stainless steel is only resistant to 3% acid, while type 316 is resistant to 3% acid up to 50 °C (120 °F) and 20% acid at room temperature. Thus type 304 SS is rarely used in contact with sulfuric acid. Type 904L and Alloy 20 are resistant to sulfuric acid at even higher concentrations above room temperature. Concentrated sulfuric acid possesses oxidizing characteristics like nitric acid, and thus silicon-bearing stainless steels are also useful. Hydrochloric acid damages any kind of stainless steel and should be avoided. All types of stainless steel resist attack from phosphoric acid and nitric acid at room temperature. At high concentrations and elevated temperatures, attack will occur, and higher-alloy stainless steels are required. In general, organic acids are less corrosive than mineral acids such as hydrochloric and sulfuric acid.

Type 304 and type 316 stainless steels are unaffected by weak bases such as ammonium hydroxide, even in high concentrations and at high temperatures. The same grades exposed to stronger bases such as sodium hydroxide at high concentrations and high temperatures will likely experience some etching and cracking. Increasing chromium and nickel contents provide increased resistance.

All grades resist damage from aldehydes and amines, though in the latter case type 316 is preferable to type 304; cellulose acetate damages type 304 unless the temperature is kept low. Fats and fatty acids only affect type 304 at temperatures above 150 °C (300 °F) and type 316 SS above 260 °C (500 °F), while type 317 SS is unaffected at all temperatures. Type 316L is required for the processing of urea.

=== Localized ===
Localized corrosion can occur in several ways, e.g. pitting corrosion and crevice corrosion. These localized attacks are most common in the presence of chloride ions. Higher chloride levels require more highly alloyed stainless steels.

Localized corrosion can be difficult to predict because it is dependent on many factors, including:

- Chloride ion concentration. Even when chloride solution concentration is known, it is still possible for localized corrosion to occur unexpectedly. Chloride ions can become unevenly concentrated in certain areas, such as in crevices (e.g. under gaskets) or on surfaces in vapor spaces due to evaporation and condensation.
- Temperature: increasing temperature increases susceptibility.
- Acidity: increasing acidity increases susceptibility.
- Stagnation: stagnant conditions increase susceptibility.
- Oxidizing species: the presence of oxidizing species, such as ferric and cupric ions, increases susceptibility.

Pitting corrosion is considered the most common form of localized corrosion. The corrosion resistance of stainless steels to pitting corrosion is often expressed by the PREN, obtained through the formula:

$$\text{PREN}=%\text{Cr}+3.3\cdot%\text{Mo}+16\cdot%\text{N}$$,

where the terms correspond to the proportion of the contents by mass of chromium, molybdenum, and nitrogen in the steel. For example, if the steel consisted of 15% chromium %Cr would be equal to 15.

The higher the PREN, the higher the pitting corrosion resistance. Thus, increasing chromium, molybdenum, and nitrogen contents provide better resistance to pitting corrosion.

Though the PREN of certain steel may be theoretically sufficient to resist pitting corrosion, crevice corrosion can still occur when the poor design has created confined areas (overlapping plates, washer-plate interfaces, etc.) or when deposits form on the material. In these select areas, the PREN may not be high enough for the service conditions. Good design, fabrication techniques, alloy selection, proper operating conditions based on the concentration of active compounds present in the solution causing corrosion, pH, etc. can prevent such corrosion.

=== Stress ===
Stress corrosion cracking (SCC) is caused by combination of tensile stress and a corrosive environment and can lead to unexpected and sudden failure of a stainless steel component. It may occur when three conditions are met:

- The part contains either applied or residual tensile stresses.
- The part is in a corrosive environment.
- The stainless steel is susceptible to SCC.

SCC can be prevented by eliminating one of these three conditions.

The SCC mechanism results from the following sequence of events:

1. Pitting occurs
2. Cracks start from a pit initiation site
3. Cracks then propagate through the metal in a transgranular or intergranular mode
4. Failure occurs

=== Galvanic ===
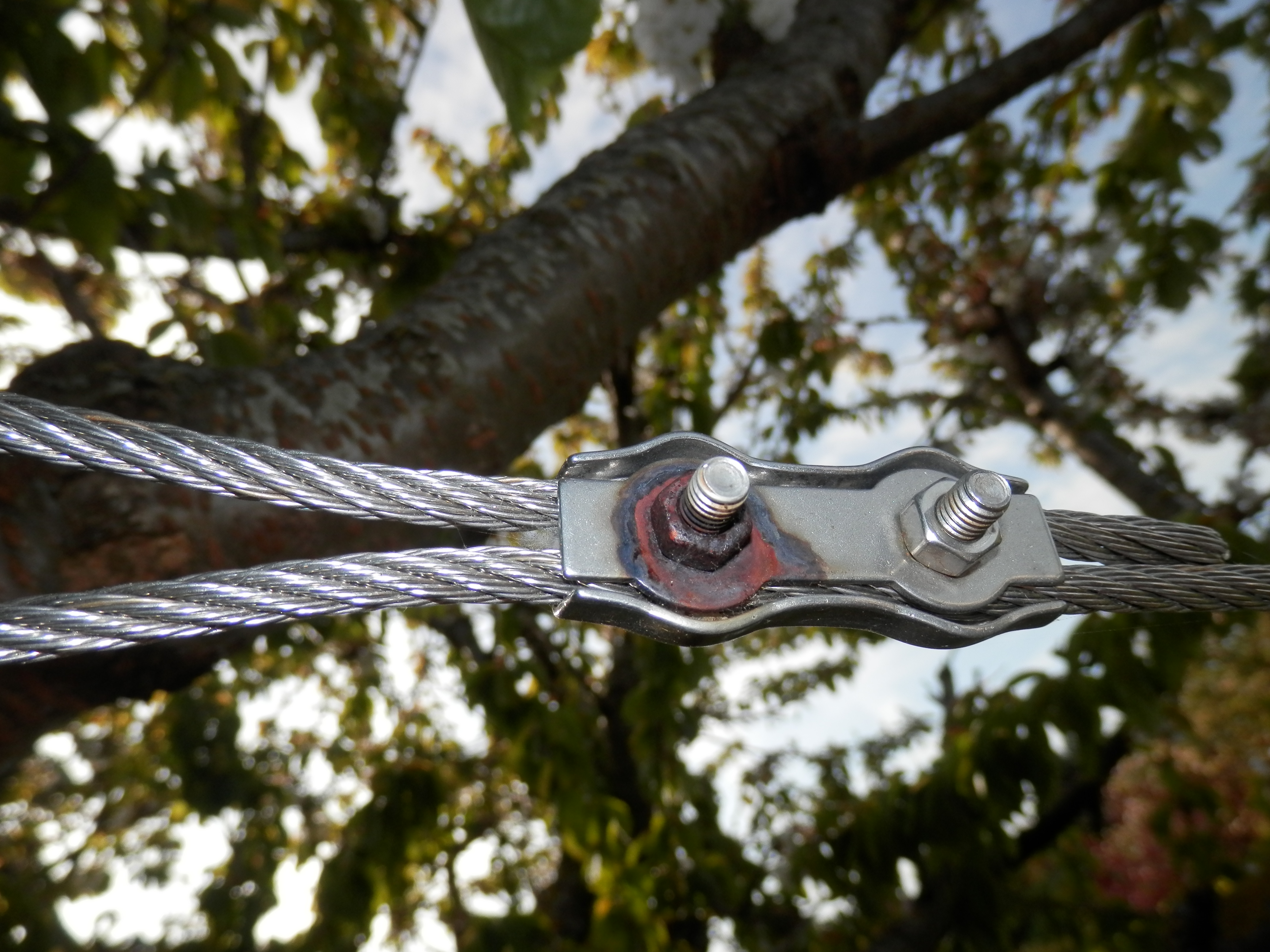
The nut on the left is not stainless steel and is rusty, unlike the nut on the right.

Galvanic corrosion (also called "dissimilar-metal corrosion") refers to corrosion damage induced when two dissimilar materials are coupled in a corrosive electrolyte. The most common electrolyte is water, ranging from freshwater to seawater. When a galvanic couple forms, one of the metals in the couple becomes the anode and corrodes faster than it would alone, while the other becomes the cathode and corrodes slower than it would alone. Stainless steel, due to having a more positive electrode potential than for example carbon steel and aluminium, becomes the cathode, accelerating the corrosion of the anodic metal. An example is the corrosion of aluminium rivets fastening stainless steel sheets in contact with water. The relative surface areas of the anode and the cathode are important in determining the rate of corrosion. In the above example, the surface area of the rivets is small compared to that of the stainless steel sheet, resulting in rapid corrosion. However, if stainless steel fasteners are used to assemble aluminium sheets, galvanic corrosion will be much slower because the galvanic current density on the aluminium surface will be many orders of magnitude smaller. A frequent mistake is to assemble stainless steel plates with carbon steel fasteners; whereas using stainless steel to fasten carbon-steel plates is usually acceptable, the reverse is not. Providing electrical insulation between the dissimilar metals, where possible, is effective at preventing this type of corrosion.

=== High-temperature ===
At elevated temperatures, all metals react with hot gases. The most common high-temperature gaseous mixture is air, of which oxygen is the most reactive component. To avoid corrosion in air, carbon steel is limited to approximately 480 °C (900 °F). Oxidation resistance in stainless steels increases with additions of chromium, silicon, and aluminium. Small additions of cerium and yttrium increase the adhesion of the oxide layer on the surface. The addition of chromium remains the most common method to increase high-temperature corrosion resistance in stainless steels; chromium reacts with oxygen to form a chromium oxide scale, which reduces oxygen diffusion into the material. The minimum 10.5% chromium in stainless steels provides resistance to approximately 700 °C (1,300 °F), while 16% chromium provides resistance up to approximately 1,200 °C (2,200 °F). Type 304, the most common grade of stainless steel with 18% chromium, is resistant to approximately 870 °C (1,600 °F). Other gases, such as sulfur dioxide, hydrogen sulfide, carbon monoxide, chlorine, also attack stainless steel. Resistance to other gases is dependent on the type of gas, the temperature, and the alloying content of the stainless steel. With the addition of up to 5% aluminium, ferritic grades Fe-Cr-Al are designed for electrical resistance and oxidation resistance at elevated temperatures. Such alloys include Kanthal, produced in the form of wire or ribbons.

== Standard finishes ==
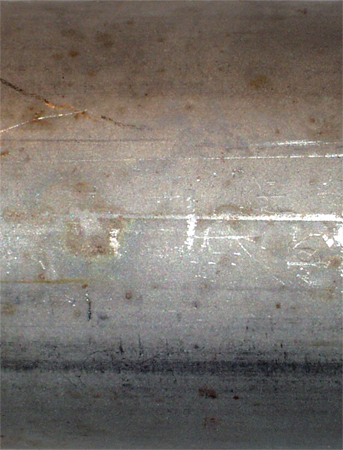
316L stainless steel, with an unpolished, mill finish

Standard mill finishes can be applied to flat rolled stainless steel directly by the rollers and by mechanical abrasives. Steel is first rolled to size and thickness and then annealed to change the properties of the final material. Any oxidation that forms on the surface (mill scale) is removed by pickling, and a passivation layer is created on the surface. A final finish can then be applied to achieve the desired aesthetic appearance. Mechanical abrasive finishing temporarily disrupts the Cr₂O₃ passive layer; XPS analysis of stainless steel surfaces treated with an impregnated polishing cloth has shown the metal oxide fraction in the outermost 5–10 nm recovers to above pre-treatment levels following cessation of abrasive contact, consistent with passive film self-repair.

The following designations are used in the U.S. to describe stainless steel finishes by ASTM A480/A480M-18 (DIN):

- No. 0: Hot-rolled, annealed, thicker plates
- No. 1 (1D): Hot-rolled, annealed and passivated
- No. 2D (2D): Cold rolled, annealed, pickled and passivated
- No. 2B (2B): Same as above with additional pass through highly polished rollers
- No. 2BA (2R): Bright annealed (BA or 2R) same as above then bright annealed under oxygen-free atmospheric condition
- No. 3 (G-2G:) Coarse abrasive finish applied mechanically
- No. 4 (1J-2J): Brushed finish
- No. 5: Satin finish
- No. 6 (1K-2K): Matte finish (brushed but smoother than #4)
- No. 7 (1P-2P): Reflective finish
- No. 8: Mirror finish
- No. 9: Bead blast finish
- No. 10: Heat colored finish – offering a wide range of electropolished and heat colored surfaces

== Joining ==
A wide range of joining processes are available for stainless steels, though welding is by far the most common.

The ease of welding largely depends on the type of stainless steel used. Austenitic stainless steels are the easiest to weld by electric arc, with weld properties similar to those of the base metal (not cold-worked). Martensitic stainless steels can also be welded by electric-arc but, as the heat-affected zone (HAZ) and the fusion zone (FZ) form martensite upon cooling, precautions must be taken to avoid cracking of the weld. Improper welding practices can additionally cause sugaring (oxide scaling) and heat tint on the backside of the weld. This can be prevented with the use of back-purging gases, backing plates, and fluxes. Post-weld heat treatment is almost always required while preheating before welding is also necessary in some cases. Electric arc welding of type 430 ferritic stainless steel results in grain growth in the HAZ, which leads to brittleness. This has largely been overcome with stabilized ferritic grades, where niobium, titanium, and zirconium form precipitates that prevent grain growth. Duplex stainless steel welding by electric arc is a common practice but requires careful control of the process parameters. Otherwise, the precipitation of unwanted intermetallic phases occurs, which reduces the toughness of the welds.

Electric arc welding processes include:

- Gas metal arc welding, also known as MIG/MAG welding
- Gas tungsten arc welding, also known as tungsten inert gas (TIG) welding
- Plasma arc welding
- Flux-cored arc welding
- Shielded metal arc welding (covered electrode)
- Submerged arc welding

MIG, MAG and TIG welding are the most common methods.

Other welding processes include:

- Stud welding
- Resistance spot welding
- Resistance seam welding
- Flash welding
- Laser beam welding
- Oxy-acetylene welding

Stainless steel may be bonded with adhesives such as silicone, silyl modified polymers, and epoxies. Acrylic and polyurethane adhesives are also used in some situations.

== Production ==
Most of the world's stainless steel production is produced by the following processes:

- Electric arc furnace (EAF): stainless steel scrap, other ferrous scrap, and ferrous alloys (Fe Cr, Fe Ni, Fe Mo, Fe Si) are melted together. The molten metal is then poured into a ladle and transferred into the AOD process (see below).
- Argon oxygen decarburization (AOD): carbon in the molten steel is removed (by turning it into carbon monoxide gas) and other compositional adjustments are made to achieve the desired chemical composition.
- Continuous casting (CC): the molten metal is solidified into slabs for flat products (a typical section is 20 centimetres (7.9 in) thick and 2 metres (6.6 ft) wide) or blooms (sections vary widely but 25 by 25 centimetres (9.8 in × 9.8 in) is the average size).
- Hot rolling (HR): slabs and blooms are reheated in a furnace and hot-rolled. Hot rolling reduces the thickness of the slabs to produce about 3 mm (0.12 in)-thick coils. Blooms, on the other hand, are hot-rolled into bars, which are cut into lengths at the exit of the rolling mill, or wire rod, which is coiled.
- Cold finishing (CF) depends on the type of product being finished:
  - Hot-rolled coils are pickled in acid solutions to remove the oxide scale on the surface, then subsequently cold rolled in Sendzimir rolling mills and annealed in a protective atmosphere until the desired thickness and surface finish is obtained. Further operations such as slitting and tube forming can be performed in downstream facilities.
  - Hot-rolled bars are straightened, then machined to the required tolerance and finish.
  - Wire rod coils are subsequently processed to produce cold-finished bars on drawing benches, fasteners on boltmaking machines, and wire on single or multipass drawing machines.

World stainless steel production figures are published yearly by the International Stainless Steel Forum. Of the EU production figures, Italy, Belgium, and Spain were notable, while Canada and Mexico produced none. China, Japan, South Korea, Taiwan, India, the US, and Indonesia were large producers while Russia reported little production.

World stainless steel production in flat and long products (metric tons, '000s)
Year	European Union	Americas	China	Asia excluding China	Other countries	World
2021	7181	2368	32632	7792	8316	58289
2020	6323	2144	30139	6429	5857	50892
2019	6805	2593	29400	7894	5525	52218
2018	7386	2808	26706	8195	5635	50729
2017	7377	2754	25774	8030	4146	48081
2016	7280	2931	24938	9956	672	45778
2015	7169	2747	21562	9462	609	41548
2014	7252	2813	21692	9333	595	41686
2013	7147	2454	18984	9276	644	38506

Breakdown of production by stainless steels families in 2017:

- Austenitic stainless steels Cr-Ni (also called 300-series, see "Grades" section above): 54%
- Austenitic stainless steels Cr-Mn (also called 200-series): 21%
- Ferritic and martensitic stainless steels (also called 400-series): 23%

== Applications ==
Stainless steel is used in a multitude of fields including architecture, art, chemical engineering, food and beverage manufacture, vehicles, medicine, energy and firearms.

== Life cycle cost ==
Life cycle cost (LCC) calculations are used to select the design and the materials that will lead to the lowest cost over the whole life of a project, such as a building or a bridge.

The formula, in a simple form, is the following:

$$\text{LCC}=\text{AC}+\text{IC}+\sum_{n=1}^N\frac{\text{OC}}{(1+i)^n}+\sum_{n=1}^N\frac{\text{LP}}{(1+i)^n}+\sum_{n=1}^N\frac{\text{RC}}{(1+i)^n}$$

where LCC is the overall life cycle cost, AC is the acquisition cost, IC the installation cost, OC the operating and maintenance costs, LP the cost of lost production due to downtime, and RC the replacement materials cost.

In addition, N is the planned life of the project, i the interest rate, and n the year in which a particular OC or LP or RC is taking place. The interest rate (i) is used to convert expenses from different years to their present value (a method widely used by banks and insurance companies) so they can be added and compared fairly. The usage of the sum formula ($\sum$) captures the fact that expenses over the lifetime of a project must be cumulated (added together) after they are corrected for interest rate.

Application of LCC in materials selection

Stainless steel used in projects often results in lower LCC values compared to other materials. The higher acquisition cost (AC) of stainless steel components are often offset by improvements in operating and maintenance costs, reduced loss of production (LP) costs, and the higher resale value of stainless steel components.

LCC calculations are usually limited to the project itself. However, there may be other costs that a project stakeholder may wish to consider:

- Utilities, such as power plants, water supply & wastewater treatment, and hospitals, cannot be shut down. Any maintenance will require extra costs associated with continuing service.
- Indirect societal costs (with possible political fallout) may be incurred in some situations such as closing or reducing traffic on bridges, creating queues, delays, loss of working hours to the people, and increased pollution by idling vehicles.

== Sustainability – recycling and reuse ==
The average carbon footprint of stainless steel (all grades, all countries) is estimated to be 2.90 kg of CO_{2} per kg of stainless steel produced, of which 1.92 kg are emissions from raw materials (Cr, Ni, Mo); 0.54 kg from electricity and steam, and 0.44 kg are direct emissions (i.e., by the stainless steel plant). Note that stainless steel produced in countries that use cleaner sources of electricity (such as France, which uses nuclear energy) will have a lower carbon footprint. Ferritics without Ni will have a lower CO_{2} footprint than austenitics with 8% Ni or more. Carbon footprint must not be the only sustainability-related factor for deciding the choice of materials:

- Over any product life, maintenance, repairs or early end of life (planned obsolescence) can increase its overall footprint far beyond initial material differences. In addition, loss of service (typically for bridges) may induce large hidden costs, such as queues, wasted fuel, and loss of man-hours.
- How much material is used to provide a given service varies with the performance, particularly the strength level, which allows lighter structures and components.

Stainless steel is 100% recyclable. An average stainless steel object is composed of about 60% recycled material of which approximately 40% originates from end-of-life products, while the remaining 60% comes from manufacturing processes. What prevents a higher recycling content is the availability of stainless steel scrap, in spite of a very high recycling rate. According to the International Resource Panel's Metal Stocks in Society report, the per capita stock of stainless steel in use in society is 80 to 180 kg (180 to 400 lb) in more developed countries and 15 kg (33 lb) in less-developed countries. There is a secondary market that recycles usable scrap for many stainless steel markets. The product is mostly coil, sheet, and blanks. This material is purchased at a less-than-prime price and sold to commercial quality stampers and sheet metal houses. The material may have scratches, pits, and dents but is made to the current specifications.

The stainless steel cycle starts with carbon steel scrap, primary metals, and slag. The next step is the production of hot-rolled and cold-finished steel products in steel mills. Some scrap is produced, which is directly reused in the melting shop. The manufacturing of components is the third step. Some scrap is produced and enters the recycling loop. Assembly of final goods and their use does not generate any material loss. The fourth step is the collection of stainless steel for recycling at the end of life of the goods (such as kitchenware, pulp and paper plants, or automotive parts). This is where it is most difficult to get stainless steel to enter the recycling loop, as shown in the table below:

Estimates of collection for recycling by sector
End-use sector	Results		Use, global average		Estimates			
End-use sector	2000	2005	Average lifetime (years)	Coefficient of variation	To landfill	Collected for recycling		
End-use sector	2000	2005	Average lifetime (years)	Coefficient of variation	To landfill	Total	Of which as stainless steel	Of which as carbon steel
Building and infrastructure	17%	18%	50	30%	8%	92%	95%	5%
Transportation (total)	21%	18%			13%	87%	85%	15%
Of which passenger cars	17%	14%	14	15%				
Of which others	4%	4%	30	20%				
Industrial machinery	29%	26%	25	20%	8%	92%	95%	5%
Household appliances & electronics	10%	10%	15	20%	30%	70%	95%	5%
Metal goods	23%	27%	15	25%	40%	60%	80%	20%

== Nanoscale stainless steel ==
Stainless steel nanoparticles have been produced in the laboratory. These may have applications as additives for high-performance applications. For example, sulfurization, phosphorization, and nitridation treatments to produce nanoscale stainless steel based catalysts could enhance the electrocatalytic performance of stainless steel for water splitting.

== Health effects ==
There is extensive research indicating some probable increased risk of cancer (particularly lung cancer) from inhaling fumes while welding stainless steel. Stainless steel welding is suspected of producing carcinogenic fumes from cadmium oxides, nickel, and chromium. According to Cancer Council Australia, "In 2017, all types of welding fumes were classified as a Group 1 carcinogen."

Stainless steel is generally considered to be biologically inert. However, during cooking, small amounts of nickel and chromium leach out of new stainless steel cookware into highly acidic food.

== See also ==
- Cobalt-chrome
- Corrosion engineering
- Corrugated stainless steel tubing
- List of steel producers
- Metallic fiber
- Pilling–Bedworth ratio
- Rouging
- Weathering steel
