= Lake Conway =

Lake in Arkansas, United States of America

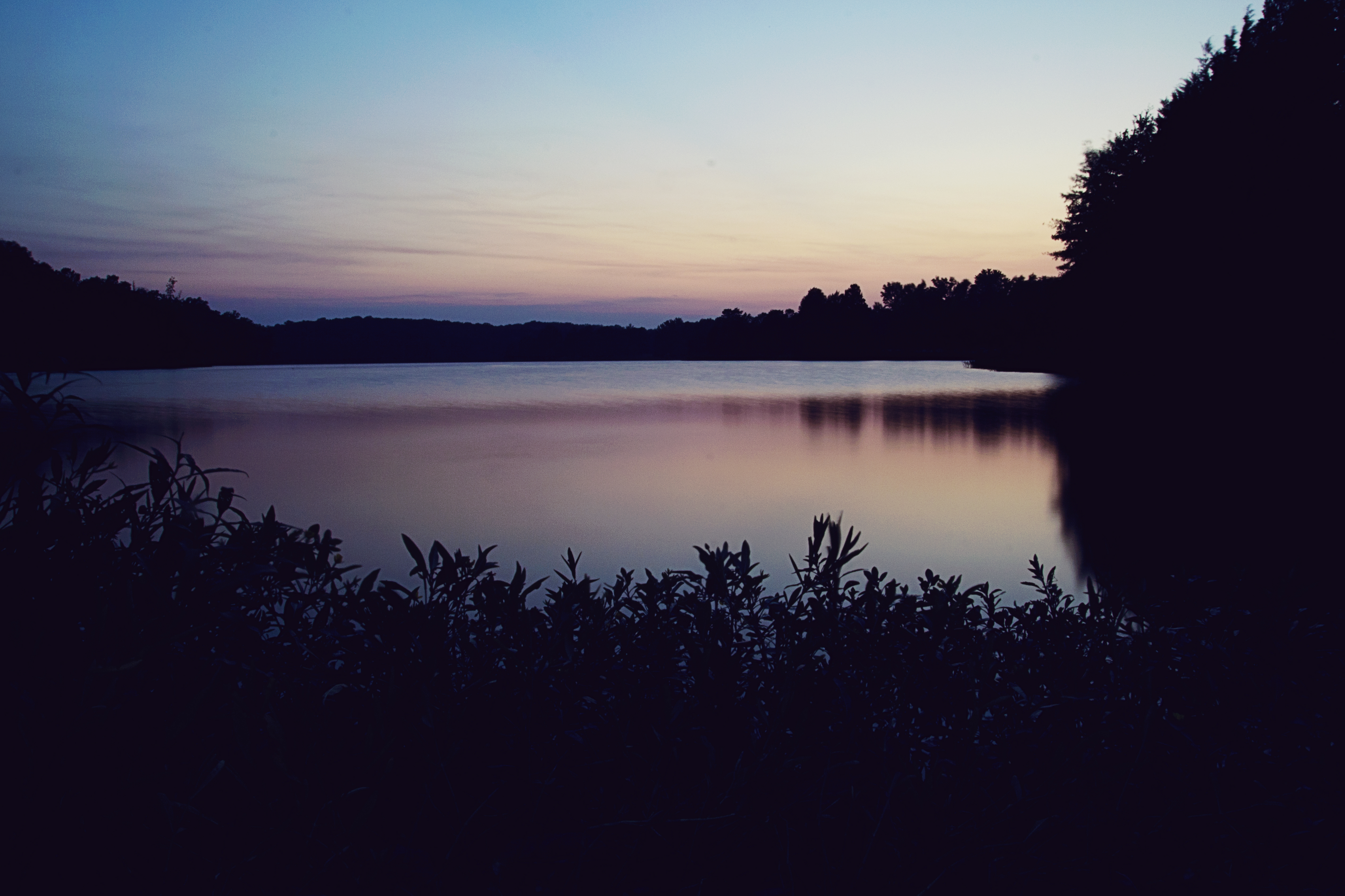

- Location within Arkansas
- Location: Faulkner County, Arkansas, United States
- Coordinates: 35.0053°N 92.3921°W
- Type: reservoir
- Primary inflows: Stone Dam Creek, Palarm Creek, Panther Creek, Little Cypress Creek, Gold Creek
- Basin countries: United States
- Max. length: 8 mi (13 km)
- Surface area: 6,700 acres (27 km^{2})
- Average depth: 4.5 ft (1 m)
- Max. depth: 16 ft (5 m)

Lake Conway is a 6,700-acre (27 km^{2}) lake in Arkansas. Lake Conway is the largest lake ever created by a state wildlife commission and the first to be created by the Arkansas Game and Fish Commission. Lake Conway is located directly east of Mayflower, Arkansas, and just a few miles southeast of Conway, Arkansas. Lake Conway is home to many major sportfish such as bass, bluegill, crappie, blue catfish, and flathead catfish. Lake Conway's average depth is 4.5 ft and at its deepest point 16 ft. Lake Conway was constructed in 1948.The lake was created by damming Palarm Creek. The lake is currently being drained as of November 2023 for silt remediation and modification of the aging dam spillway gates. The lake is currently slated to be empty for 5 years.

== Creating Lake Conway ==
Residents of Faulkner County were aggressive to have the construction of Lake Conway done. Over three dozen court cases had to be won, and over fifty thousand dollars to buy the land to construct the lake. The land was purchased at four dollars an acre to make Lake Conway. It was considered poor land due to being mostly swamp, and useless to farm on. The Arkansas Game and Fish Commission was intrigued by promoters for the lake to be constructed and committed to building a dam if the residents of Faulkner County paid for the land.

After word of the construction of the lake was found out by residents, land soared in price to up to as much as one hundred dollars an acre. An original estimate of twenty thousand dollars was nowhere close to the actual cost of the land. A state wide campaign was started, and over fifty thousand people donated for funds to construct Lake Conway. Many disputes were settled in court, but a few land owners refused to sell their land for the lake's construction. Amendment 35 was passed in 1945 that required these land owners to sell their land to the state government. Eminent domain was the reasoning for the law and if the state paid a reasonable amount for the land then it was legal. Amendment 35 was brought before the Arkansas Supreme Court and upheld.

Construction of Lake Conway's dam was offered to R. W. Hammock Construction Company for sixty five thousand dollars and was accepted. The size of the lake was described as, "The completed lake is approximately eight miles long and has a shore-line of fifty two miles." Lake Conway was celebrated and opened on July 4, 1951 by over 18,000 residents of Arkansas visiting the lake. Early estimations of economic impact for the area was 51,000 annual visitors, and a dollar value of over $1,000,000 in 2019 due to inflation. Original stockings in the lake included: bream, bass, crappie, and 200 frogs.

== Fishing ==
Lake Conway is treacherous for new boaters due to stumps and logs not visible on the surface. The Arkansas Game and Fish Commission tried to remedy this problem by creating boating lanes for boaters navigating the lake. Public docks and accessible fishing is available for fishermen.

Lake Conway is well known for large crappie due to the size limitation of a 10-inch minimum to keep the fish. A nursery pond, on the east side of the lake, is situated close to the lake, and is important for maintaining the numerous crappie in the lake. Fingerling size crappie are grown in the pond to ensure predators cannot eat them, and released through a canal connected to the lake when the crappie reach an appropriate size to survive in the main lake. Crappie were almost nonexistent in the lake before 1968. After the construction of the nursery pond, the number of crappie soared.

== Mayflower oil spill ==
On March 29, 2013 a pipeline containing oil burst in Mayflower. Twenty-two homes were evacuated, and the pipeline was shut off after the leak was discovered. Over 12,000 barrels of oil and water were recovered when cleaning the area. The Environmental Protection Agency and The Department of Transportation’s Pipeline and Hazardous Materials Safety Administration sent officials to access the situation. There was concern over oil reaching Lake Conway through a storm drain system that fed a cove. Local law enforcement and firefighters were able to build dikes to prevent the oil from reaching the lake. Nearly 3,600 ft of boom was provided by Exxon for precautionary reasons.

== See also ==
- List of Arkansas dams and reservoirs
