= ISO 14555 =

ISO 14555 is an ISO standard for arc stud welding of metallic materials. It was incorporated as a European Norm as EN (ISO) 14555 and is referenced by Eurocode 4 in the evaluations of the design shear resistance of a headed stud which is automatically welded according to this standard.

ISO 14555 covers arc stud welding of metallic materials subject to static and dynamic loading. It specifies requirements that are particular to stud welding, in relation to welding knowledge, quality requirements, welding procedure specification, welding procedure qualification, qualification testing of operators and testing of production welds.

ISO 14555 is appropriate where it is necessary to demonstrate the capability of a manufacturer to produce welded construction of a specified quality.

ISO 14555 has been prepared in a comprehensive manner, with a view to its being used as a reference in contracts. The requirements contained within it can be adopted in full, or partially, if certain requirements are not relevant to a particular construction.

== See also ==
- EN 1994
