= Boom (containment) =

Temporary floating barrier used to contain an oil spill

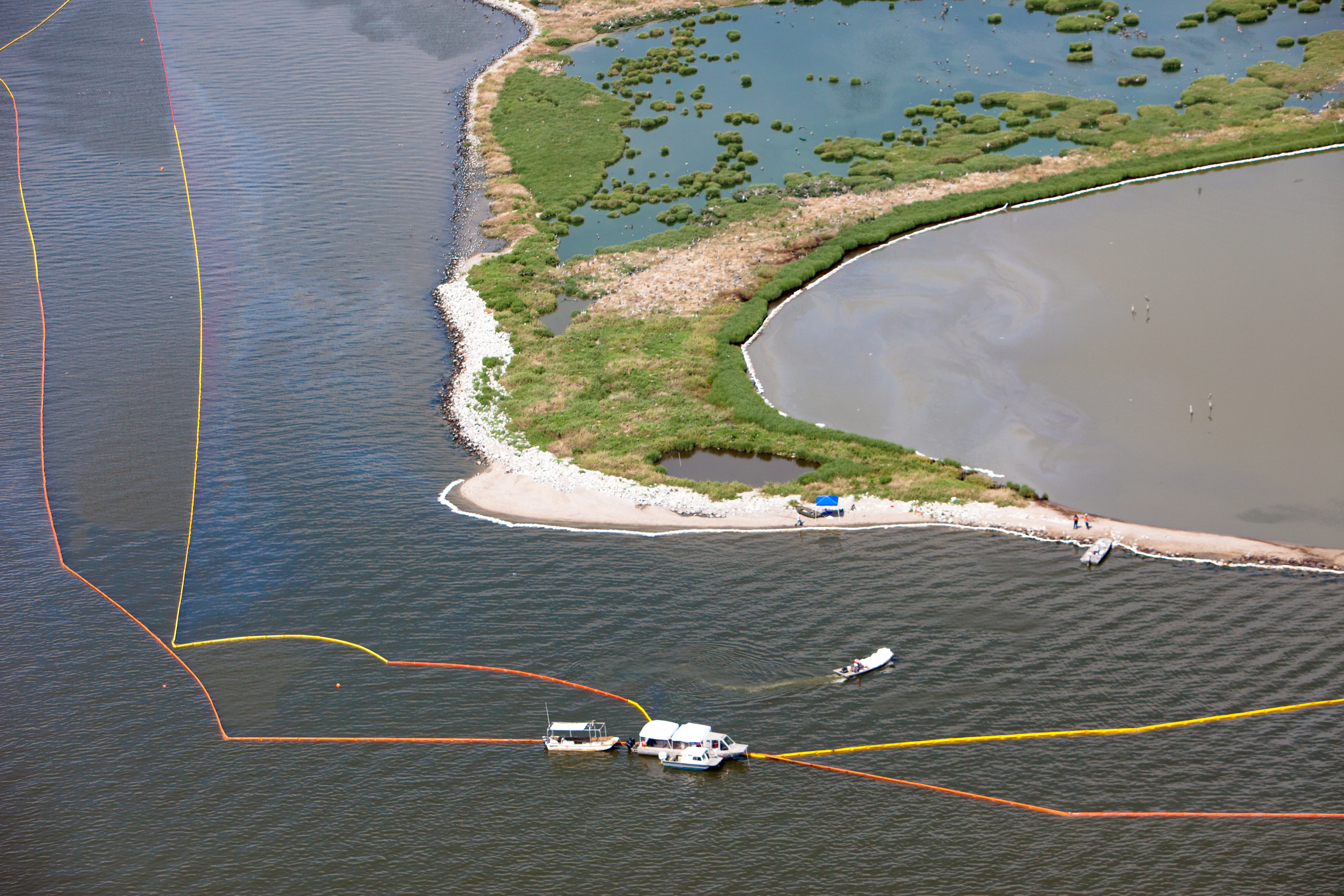
Oil spill containment booms in use after the Deepwater Horizon oil spill in the Gulf of Mexico in 2010

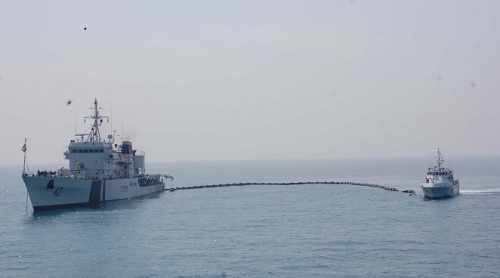
Two Indian Coast Guard vessels deploying an ocean boom

A containment boom is a temporary floating barrier used to contain an oil spill. Booms are used to reduce the possibility of polluting shorelines and other resources, and to help make recovery easier. Booms help to concentrate oil in thicker surface rather than disperse across larger areas. Booms are also used to prevent ice jams.

== Tactics ==
- Containment booming: placing a boom in a body of contaminated water for the purpose of holding or slowing the movement of contamination.
- Diversion booming: placing a boom in a body of contaminated water for the purpose of diverting the contamination to a collection point.
- Deflection booming: placing a boom in a body of water for the sole purpose of changing the course of the contamination. This method is used for contamination that is not intended to be recovered and so is not typically associated with oil spills.
- Exclusion booming: placing a boom in a body of water for the purpose of blocking off a sensitive area from contamination. It is not recommended in fast water, and as diversion booming or deflection booming is better suited. However, when diversion booming and deflection booming tactics are not suitable and resource protection is still needed, like because of a fast high tide in a sensitive estuary, an arrangement of booms with a decelerator is needed.

== Types ==
Oil containment booms are available in several designs, each suited to specific spill conditions and operational needs. The main types include:

=== Solid flotation booms ===
These booms use closed-cell foam or plastic floats encased in UV-stabilized PVC for buoyancy. They are lightweight, cost-effective, and quick to deploy, making them suitable for a wide range of water conditions from calm harbors to moderate offshore currents. However, they may have a shorter service life in rough waters.

=== Fence booms ===
Fence booms feature flat, rigid floats and an integrated chain ballast for stability. Constructed from heavy-duty PVC or similar materials, they are durable and require minimal maintenance, making them ideal for long-term use in calm or low-current waters such as harbors and marinas. Their heavier weight can make deployment more challenging compared to solid flotation booms.

=== Inflatable booms ===
Inflatable or air-filled booms are designed for rapid deployment during emergency spills. Stored compactly and inflated on-site, they offer high buoyancy-to-weight ratios and are used in both offshore and inshore environments. These booms require regular inspection to ensure readiness for immediate use.

=== Curtain booms ===
Curtain booms combine features of oil containment and silt control. They include a floating section similar to standard booms and an extended curtain below the waterline to trap oil and suspended sediment. This type is often used in marine construction areas or environments where both oil and particulate containment are required.

== See also ==
- Boom (navigational barrier)
- Log boom
