= Flash welding =

Type of resistance welding that does not use any filler metals

Animation of flashing operation in flash welding

Flash welding is a type of resistance welding that does not use any filler metals. The pieces of metal to be welded are set apart at a predetermined distance based on material thickness, material composition, and desired properties of the finished weld. Current is applied to the metal, and the gap between the two pieces creates resistance and produces the arc required to melt the metal. Once the pieces of metal reach the proper temperature, they are pressed together, effectively forge welding them together.

== Parameters ==
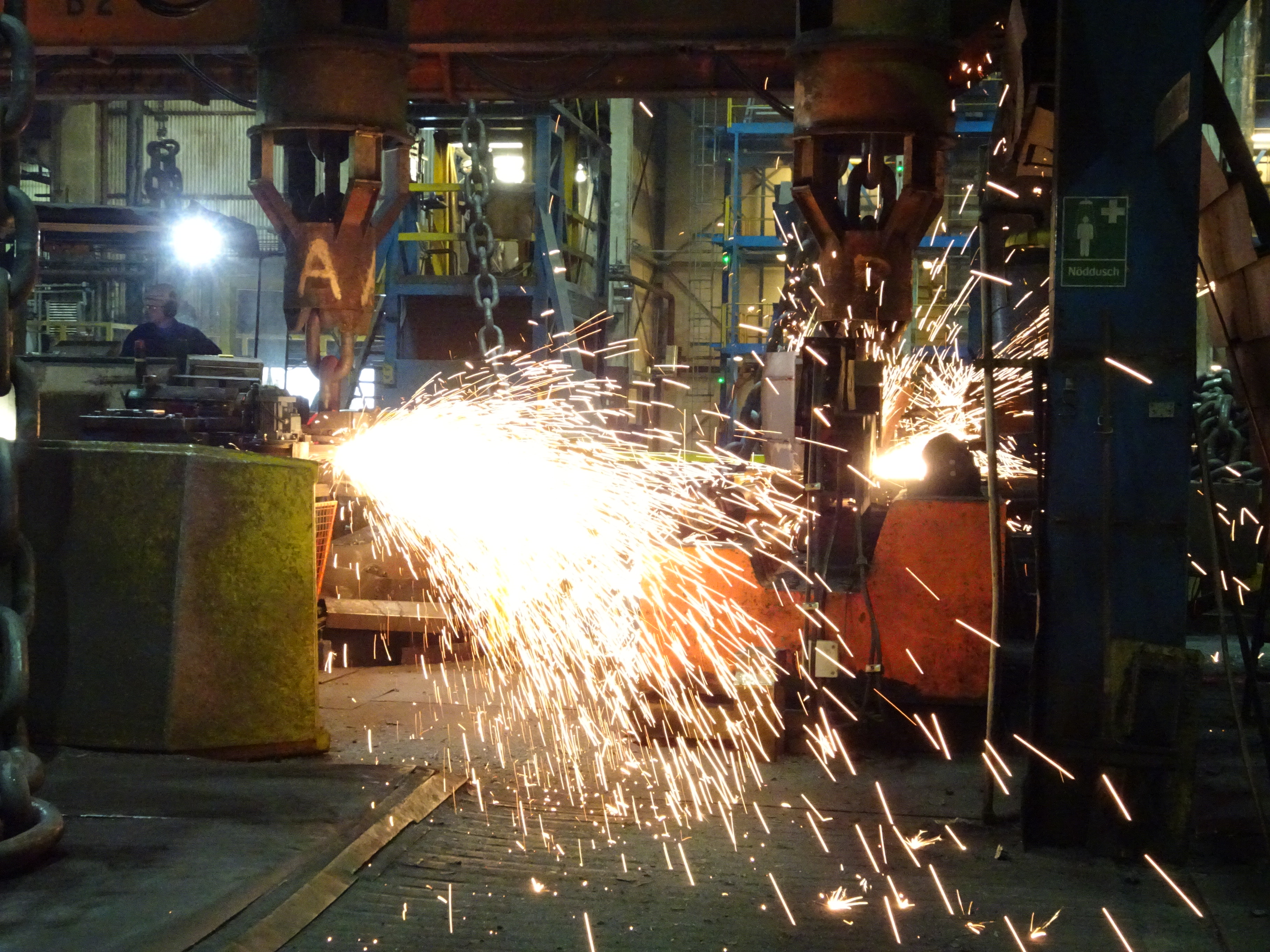
Flash welding and grinding of a new link in the hanging chain in Ramnäs, Sweden

According to a study published in Materials and Design, several parameters affect the final product. Flash time is the time that the arc is present. Upset time is the amount of time that the two pieces are pressed together. Flash time needs to be long enough to sufficiently heat the metal before it is pressed together. However, if it is too long, too much of the base metal begins to melt away. The upset time is critical in creating the desired mechanical properties of the finished weld. During the upset, any impurities in the base metal are pressed out creating a perfect weld. If the upset time is too short, some of the impurities may remain in the base metal creating a defective weld. The upset time is also crucial in the strength of the finished weld because it is during the upset that coalescence occurs between the two pieces of metal. If the upset time is too short, the two pieces of metal may not completely bond.

Flash butt welding on the FBWM-60

Very often flash butt welding is controlled by distance rather than time such that the flashing would occur for a pre-determined length, say 5 mm, before the upsetting cycle starts. Upsetting may then also be controlled by distance. A parameter would be set to apply the upsetting force until a certain distance has been upset. It is generally the upsetting distance that is more important than the upsetting time.

At the end of upsetting there is commonly a 'hold time' during which the joint is held still to allow the joint to cool and the two pieces of metal to completely bond.

== Applications ==
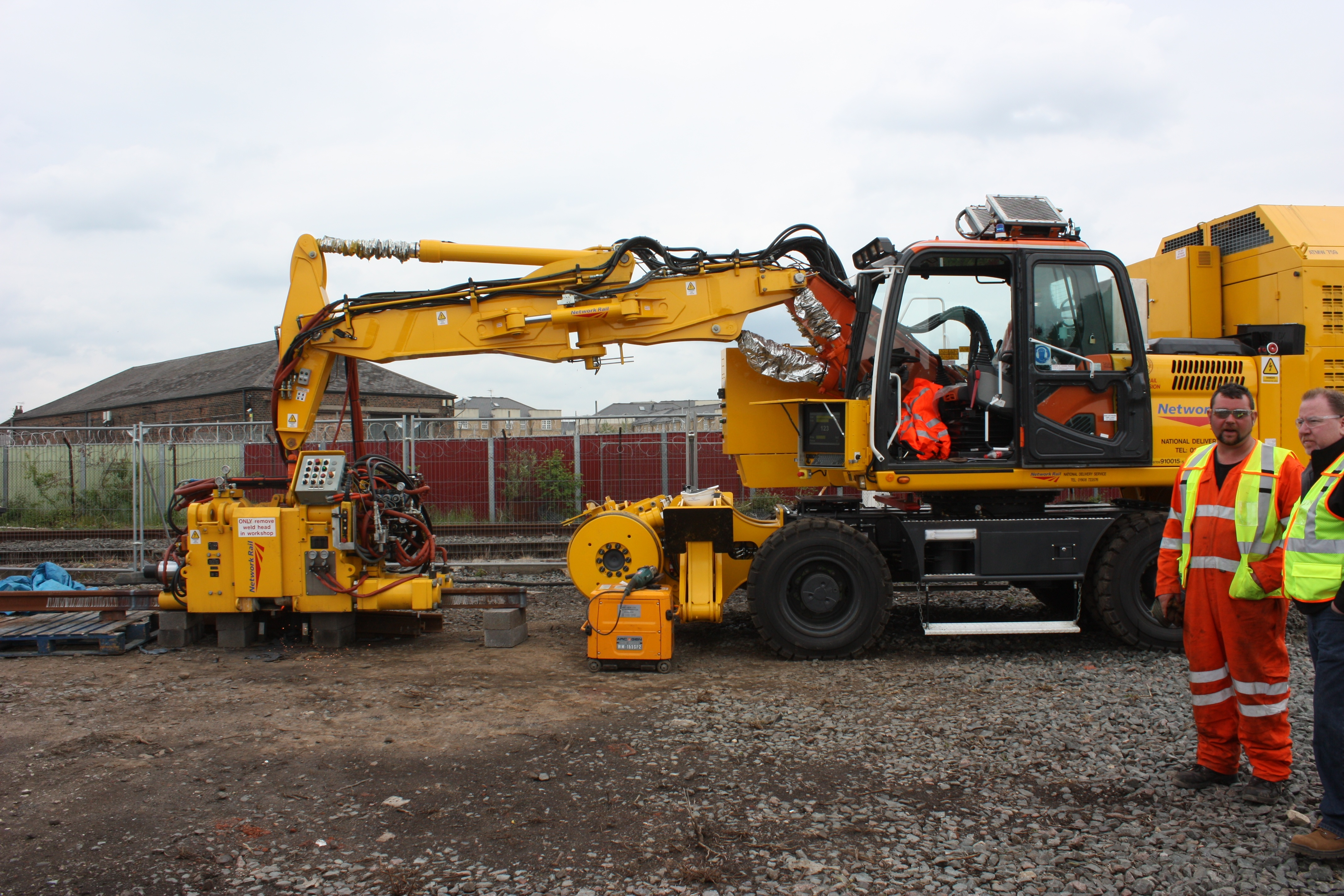
Flash welding machine of Network Rail

Railroads use flash welding to join sections of mainline rail together to create long welded rail (LWR) in a factory setting or continuous welded rail (CWR) in track, which is much smoother than mechanically-joined rail because there are no gaps between the sections of rail. The smoother rail reduces the wear on the rails themselves, effectively reducing the frequency of inspections and maintenance. Continuous welded rail is particularly used on high-speed rail lines because of the smoothness of the rail head.

Flash welding is also beneficial because it allows dissimilar metals, including non ferrous metals, to be joined. That allows switches and crossings, which are generally composed of high manganese steel, to be effectively welded to carbon steel rail with the use of a stainless steel insert, while keeping the desired mechanical properties of both the rails and the crossings intact. The ability of a single process to weld many different metals, with simple parameter adjustments, makes it very versatile. Flash welding is also used in the metal building industry to increase the length of the angle iron used to fabricate joists.

The aluminum industry uses flash welding to join aluminum, steel, and copper in various current-carrying conductors called busbars. The steel is used for strength, the copper is used for conductivity, and the aluminum is used for its combination of cost and conductivity.

== See also ==
- Rail lengths
- Percussion welding
