= High-temperature corrosion =

Type of corrosion

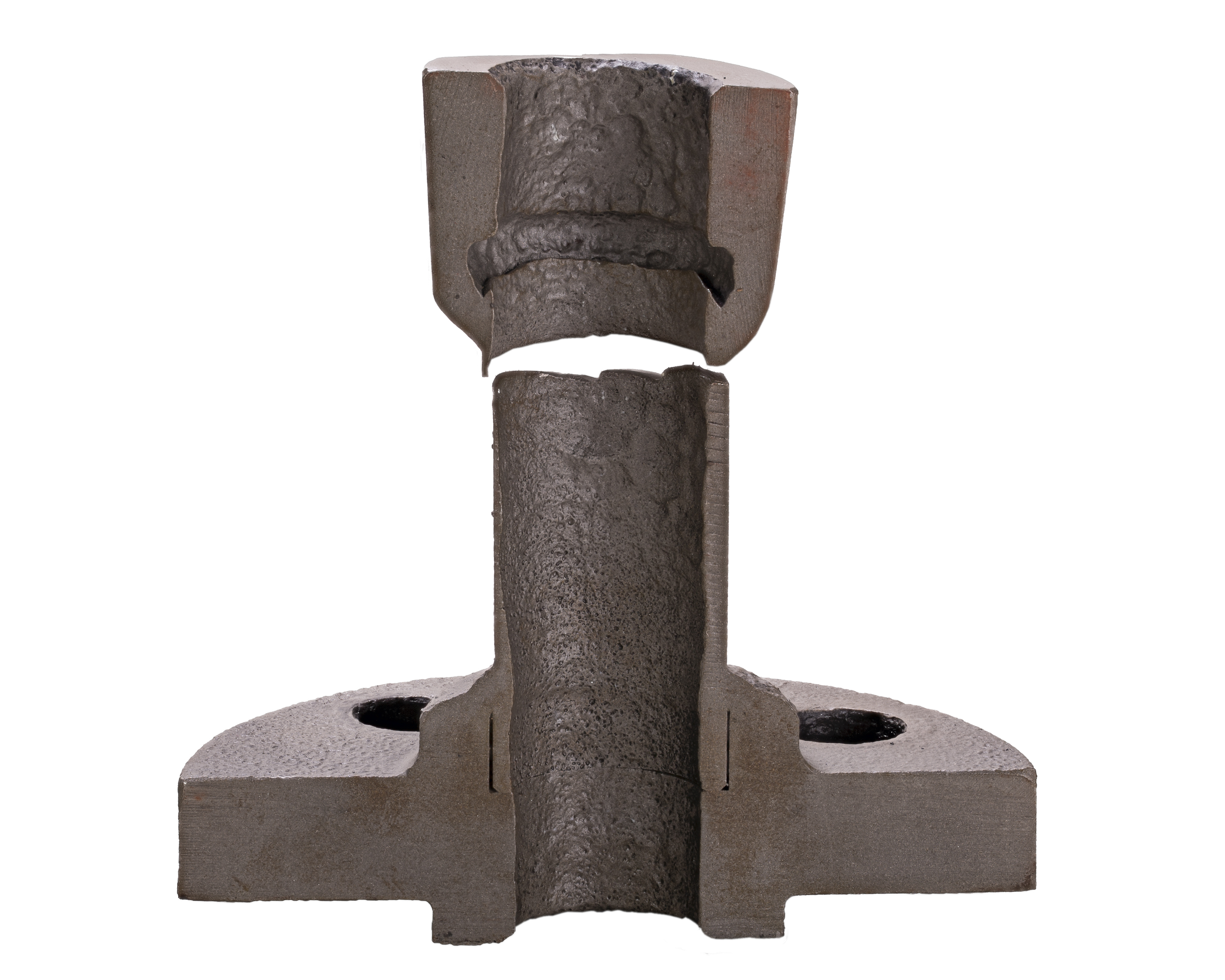
High-temperature sulfur corrosion of a 12 CrMo 19 5 pipe stub

High-temperature corrosion is a mechanism of corrosion that takes place when gas turbines, diesel engines, furnaces or other machinery come in contact with hot gas containing certain contaminants. Fuel sometimes contains vanadium compounds or sulfates, which can form low melting point compounds during combustion. These liquid melted salts are strongly corrosive to stainless steel and other alloys normally resistant with respect to corrosion at high temperatures. Other types of high-temperature corrosion include high-temperature oxidation, sulfidation, and carbonization. High temperature oxidation and other corrosion types are commonly modeled using the Deal-Grove model to account for diffusion and reaction dynamics.

== Sulfates ==
Two types of sulfate-induced hot corrosion are generally distinguished: Type I takes place above the melting point of sodium sulfate, whereas Type II occurs below the melting point of sodium sulfate but in the presence of small amounts of SO_{3}.

In Type I, the protective oxide scale is dissolved by the molten salt. Sulfur is released from the salt and diffuses into the metal substrate, forming grey- or blue-colored aluminum or chromium sulfides. With the aluminum or chromium sequestered, after the salt layer has been removed, the steel cannot rebuild a new protective oxide layer. Alkali sulfates are formed from sulfur trioxide and sodium-containing compounds. As the formation of vanadates is preferred, sulfates are formed only if the amount of alkali metals is higher than the corresponding amount of vanadium.

The same kind of attack has been observed for potassium sulfate and magnesium sulfate.

== Vanadium ==
Vanadium is present in petroleum, especially from Canada, western United States, Venezuela and the Caribbean region, often bound to porphyrine in organometallic complexes. These complexes get concentrated on the higher-boiling fractions, which are then form the base of heavy residual fuel oils. Residues of sodium, primarily from sodium chloride and spent oil treatment chemicals, are also present in this petroleum fraction. Combusting any amount more than 100 ppm of sodium and vanadium will yield ash capable of causing fuel ash corrosion.

Most fuels contain small traces of vanadium. The vanadium is oxidized to different vanadates. Molten vanadates present as deposits on metal can flux oxide scales and passivation layers. Furthermore, the presence of vanadium accelerates the diffusion of oxygen through the fused salt layer to the metal substrate. Vanadates can be present in semiconducting or ionic form, where the semiconducting form has significantly higher corrosivity as the oxygen is transported via oxygen vacancies. The ionic form, in contrast, transports oxygen by diffusion of the entire vanadate, which is significantly slower. The semiconducting form is rich in vanadium pentoxide.

At high temperatures or when there is a lower availability of oxygen, refractory oxides—vanadium dioxide and vanadium trioxide—form. These more reduced forms of vanadium do not promote corrosion. However, at conditions most common for burning, vanadium pentoxide gets formed. Together with sodium oxide, vanadates of various composition ratios are formed. Vanadates of composition approximating Na_{2}O.6 V_{2}O_{5} have the highest corrosion rates at the temperatures between 593 °C and 816 °C; at lower temperatures, the vanadate is in solid state, and at higher temperatures, vanadates with higher proportion of vanadium contribute the most to higher corrosion rates.

The solubility of the passivation layer oxides in the molten vanadates depends on the composition of the oxide layer. Iron(III) oxide is readily soluble in vanadates between Na_{2}O.6 V_{2}O_{5} and 6 Na_{2}O.V_{2}O_{5}, at temperatures below 705 °C in amounts up to equal to the mass of the vanadate. This composition range is common for ashes, which aggravates the problem. Chromium(III) oxide, nickel(II) oxide, and cobalt(II) oxide are less soluble in vanadates; they convert the vanadates to the less corrosive ionic form and their vanadates are tightly adherent, refractory, and act as oxygen barriers.

The rate of corrosion caused by vanadates can be lowered by reducing the amount of excess air available for combustion to preferentially form the refractory oxides, using refractory coatings on the exposed surfaces, or using high-chromium alloys, such as 50% Ni/50% Cr or 40% Ni/60% Cr.

The presence of sodium in a ratio of 1:3 gives the lowest melting point and must be avoided. This melting point of 535 °C can cause problems on the hot spots of the engine like piston crowns, valve seats, and turbochargers.

== Lead ==
Lead can form a low-melting slag capable of fluxing protective oxide scales. Lead is more often known for causing stress corrosion cracking in common materials that are exposed to molten lead. The cracking tendency of lead has been known for some time, since most iron based alloys, including those used in steel containers and vessels for molten lead baths, usually fail due to cracking.

Lead can also induce liquid metal embrittlement, a rapid brittle fracture under tensile stress where liquid lead penetrates grain boundaries. Lead also causes "hot shortness" in stainless steel, leading to a loss of ductility at high temperatures as lead segregates to grain boundaries. Additionally, in nuclear reactor environments, lead impurities can concentrate in steam generator tubes, linked to stress corrosion cracking, particularly aggravated in caustic conditions.

== See also ==
- Internal oxidation
- Deal-Grove model
- Thermal oxidation
- Scaling (metallurgy)
- Corrosion engineering
