= Flux (metallurgy) =

Chemical used in metallurgy for cleaning or purifying molten metal

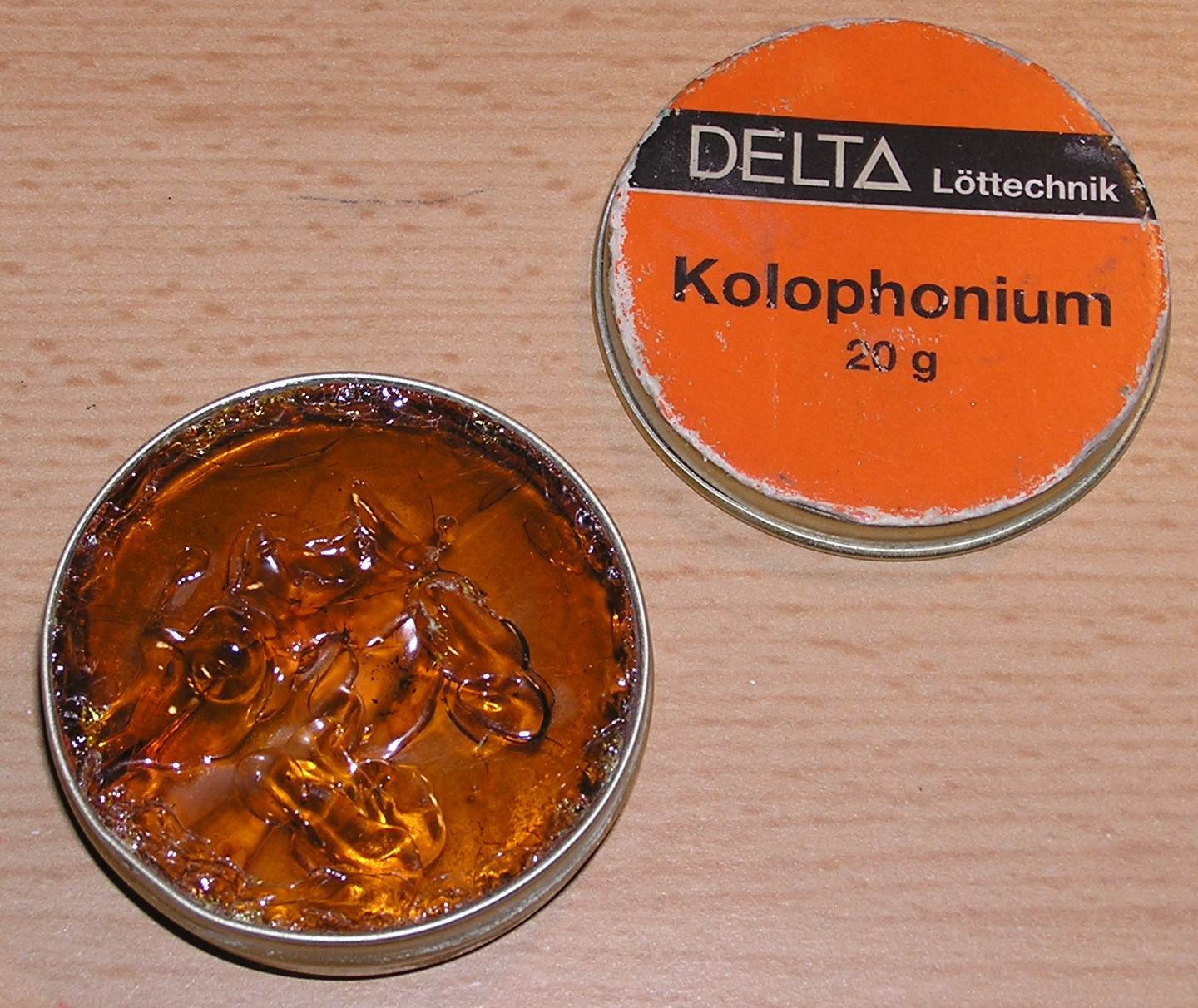
Rosin used as flux for soldering

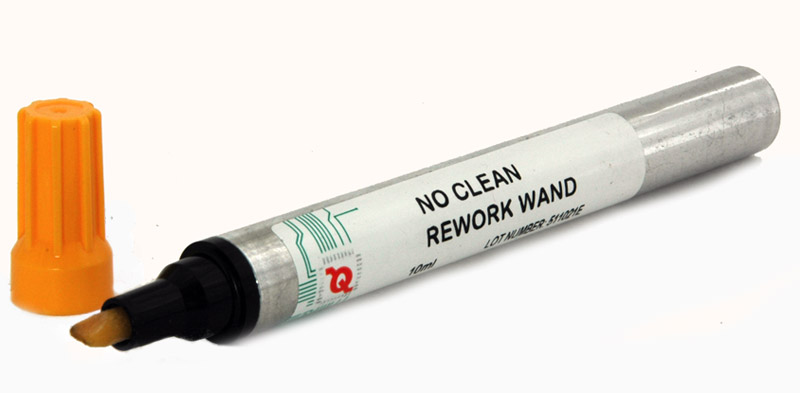
A flux pen used for electronics rework

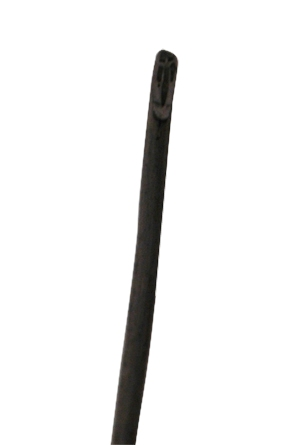
Multicore solder containing flux

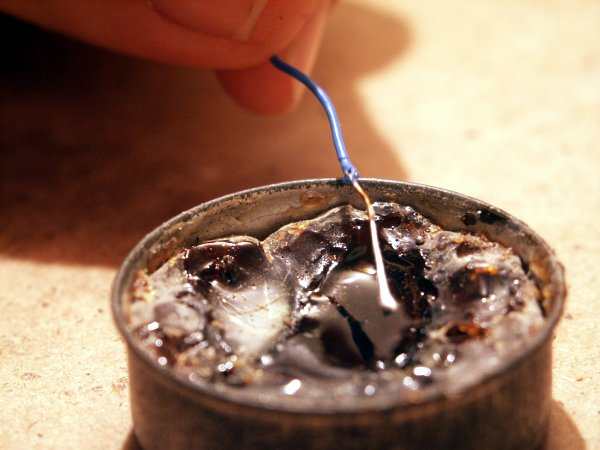
Wire freshly coated with solder, held above molten rosin flux

In metallurgy, a flux is a chemical reducing agent, flowing agent, or purifying agent. Fluxes may have more than one function at a time. They are used in both extractive metallurgy and metal joining. They are named for the ability to make molten metals easier to flow during smelting.

Some of the earliest known fluxes were sodium carbonate, potash, charcoal, coke, borax, lime, lead sulfide and certain minerals containing phosphorus. Iron ore was also used as a flux in the smelting of copper. These agents served various functions, the simplest being a reducing agent, which prevented oxides from forming on the surface of the molten metal, while others absorbed impurities into slag, which could be scraped off molten metal.

Fluxes are also used in foundries for removing impurities from molten nonferrous metals such as aluminium, or for adding desirable trace elements such as titanium.

As reducing agents, fluxes facilitate soldering, brazing, and welding by removing oxidation from the metals to be joined. In some applications, molten flux also serves as a heat-transfer medium, facilitating heating of the joint by the soldering tool.

== Uses ==
=== Metal joining ===
In high-temperature metal joining processes (welding, brazing and soldering), fluxes are nearly inert at room temperature, but become strongly reducing at elevated temperatures, preventing oxidation of the base and filler materials. The role of flux is typically dual: dissolving the oxides already present on the metal surface to facilitate wetting by molten metal, and acting as an oxygen barrier by coating the hot surface, preventing oxidation.

For example, tin-lead solder attaches very well to copper metal, but poorly to its oxides, which form quickly at soldering temperatures. By preventing the formation of metal oxides, flux enables the solder to adhere to the clean metal surface, rather than forming beads, as it would on an oxidized surface.

==== Soldering ====
In soldering metals, flux serves a threefold purpose: it removes any oxidized metal from the surfaces to be soldered, seals out air thus preventing further oxidation, and improves the wetting characteristics of the liquid solder. Some fluxes are corrosive, so the parts must be cleaned with a damp sponge or other absorbent material after soldering to prevent damage. Several types of flux are used in electronics.

A number of standards exist to define the various flux types. The principal standard is J-STD-004.

Various tests, including the ROSE test, may be used after soldering to check for the presence of ionic or other contaminants that could cause short circuits or other problems.

==== Brazing and silver soldering ====
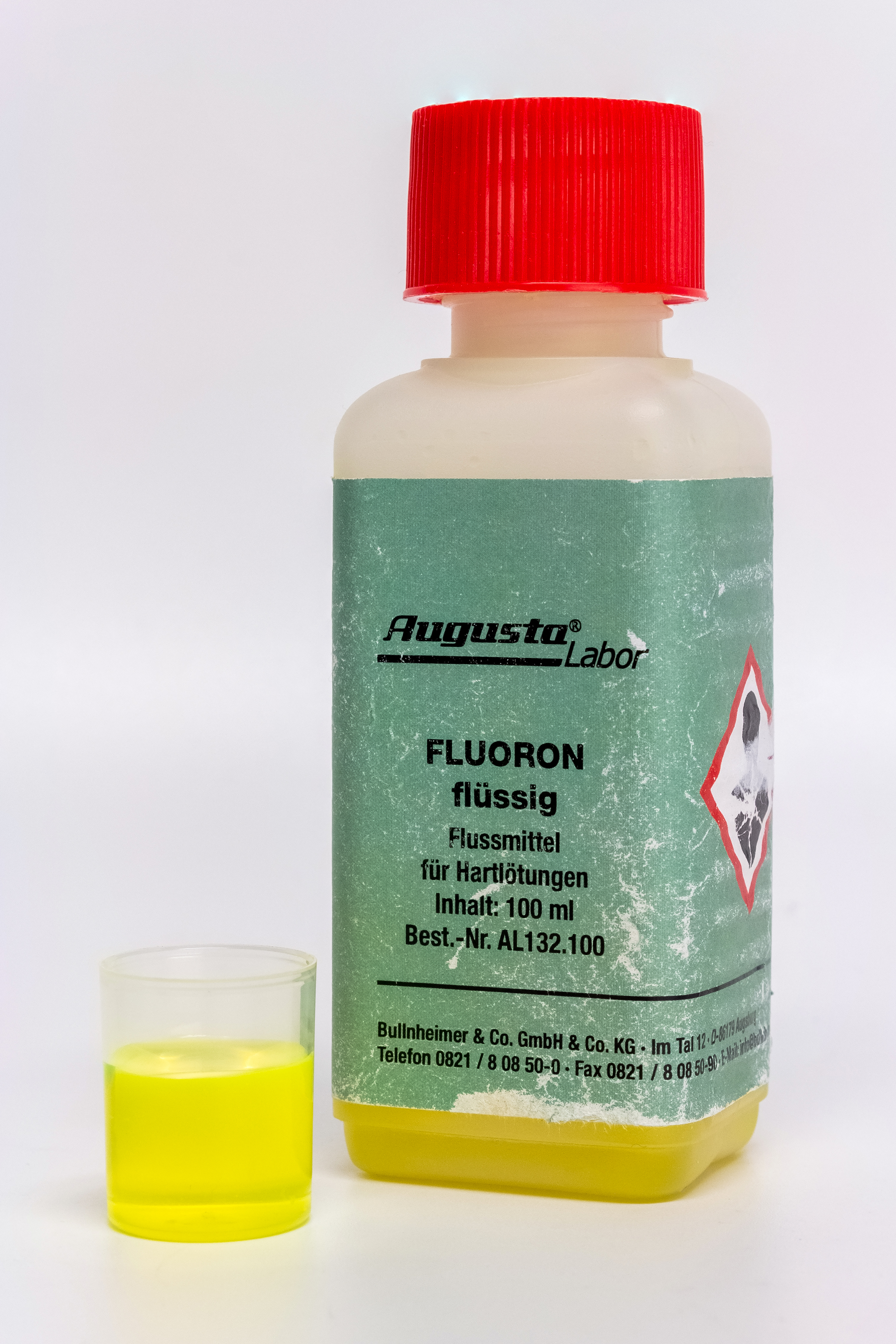
Flux for hard soldering, used by silversmiths.

Brazing (sometimes known as silver soldering or hard soldering) requires a higher temperature than soft soldering (> 450 °C). As well as removing existing oxides, rapid oxidation of the metal at the elevated temperatures must be avoided. This means that fluxes must be more aggressive and to provide a physical barrier. Traditionally borax was used as a flux for brazing, but there are now many different fluxes available, often using active chemicals such as fluorides as well as wetting agents. Many of these chemicals are toxic and due care should be taken during their use.

=== Smelting ===
In the process of smelting, inorganic chlorides, fluorides (see fluorite), limestone and other materials are designated as "fluxes" when added to the contents of a smelting furnace or a cupola for the purpose of purging the metal of chemical impurities such as phosphorus, and of rendering slag more liquid at the smelting temperature. Slag is a liquid mixture of ash, flux, and other impurities. This reduction of slag viscosity with temperature, increasing the flow of slag in smelting, is the origin of the word flux in metallurgy.

The flux most commonly used in iron and steel furnaces is limestone, which is charged in the proper proportions with the iron and fuel.

== Drawbacks ==
Fluxes have several serious drawbacks:

- Corrosivity, which is mostly due to the aggressive compounds of the activators; hygroscopic properties of the flux residues may aggravate the effects
- Interference with test equipment, which is due to the insulating residues deposited on the test contacts on electronic circuit boards
- Interference with machine vision systems when the layer of flux or its remains is too thick or improperly located
- Contamination of sensitive parts, e.g. facets of laser diodes, contacts of connectors and mechanical switches, and MEMS assemblies
- Deterioration of electrical properties of printed circuit boards, as soldering temperatures are above the glass transition temperature of the board material and flux components (e.g. glycols, or chloride and bromide ions) can diffuse into its matrix; e.g. water-soluble fluxes containing polyethylene glycol were demonstrated to have such impact
- Deterioration of high-frequency circuit performance by flux residues
- Deterioration of surface insulation resistance, which tends to be as much as three orders of magnitude lower than the bulk resistance of the material
- Electromigration and growth of whiskers between nearby traces, aided by ionic residues, surface moisture and a bias voltage
- The fumes liberated during soldering have adverse health effects, and volatile organic compounds can be outgassed during processing
- The solvents required for post-soldering cleaning of the boards are expensive and may have adverse environmental impact

In special cases the drawbacks are sufficiently serious to warrant using fluxless techniques.

=== Dangers ===
Acid flux types (not used in electronics) may contain hydrochloric acid, zinc chloride or ammonium chloride, which are harmful to humans. Therefore, flux should be handled with gloves and goggles, and used with adequate ventilation.

Prolonged exposure to rosin fumes released during soldering can cause occupational asthma (formerly called colophony disease in this context) in sensitive individuals, though which component of the fumes that causes the problem is unknown.

While molten solder has low tendency to adhere to organic materials, molten fluxes, especially of the resin/rosin type, adhere well to fingers. A mass of hot sticky flux can transfer more heat to skin and cause more serious burns than a comparable particle of non-adhering molten metal, which can be quickly shaken off. In this regard, molten flux is similar to molten hot glue.

=== Fluxless techniques ===
In some cases the presence of flux is undesirable; flux traces interfere with e.g. precision optics or MEMS assemblies. Flux residues also tend to outgas in vacuum and space applications, and traces of water, ions and organic compounds may adversely affect long-term reliability of non-hermetic packages. Trapped flux residues are also the cause of most voids in the joints. Flux-less techniques are therefore desirable there.

For successful soldering and brazing, the oxide layer must be removed from both the surfaces of the materials and the surface of the filler metal preform. Exposed surfaces also require protection against oxidation during heating. Flux-coated preforms can also be used to eliminate flux residue entirely from the soldering process.

Protecting surfaces against further oxidation is relatively simple, using vacuum or inert atmosphere. Removal of the native oxide layer is more troublesome, requiring physical or chemical cleaning methods. Surfaces can be protected by, e.g., gold plating. The gold layer must be sufficiently thick and non-porous to provide protection for reasonable storage time. Thick gold metallization also limits choice of soldering alloys, as tin-based solders dissolve gold and form brittle intermetallics, embrittling the joint. Thicker gold coatings are usually limited to use with indium-based solders and solders with high gold content.

Removal of the oxides from the solder preform is also troublesome. Fortunately some alloys are able to dissolve the surface oxides in their bulk when superheated by several degrees above their melting point; the Sn-Cu_{1} and Sn-Ag_{4} require superheating by 18–19 °C, the Sn-Sb_{5} requires as little as 10 °C, but the Sn-Pb_{37} alloy requires 77 °C above its melting point to dissolve its surface oxide. The self-dissolved oxide degrades the solder's properties and increases its viscosity in molten state, however, so this approach is not optimal.

Solder preforms are preferred to have high volume-to-surface ratio, as that limits the amount of oxide formed. Pastes have to contain smooth spherical particles, preforms are ideally made of round wire. Problems with preforms can be also sidestepped by depositing the solder alloy directly on the surfaces of the parts or substrates, by chemical or electrochemical means for example.

A protective atmosphere with chemically reducing properties can be beneficial in some cases. Molecular hydrogen can be used to reduce surface oxides of tin and indium at temperatures above 430 and 470 °C; for zinc the temperature is above 500 °C, where zinc is already becoming volatilized. (At lower temperatures the reaction speed is too slow for practical applications.) The reaction requires very low partial pressures of oxygen and water vapor.

Other reactive atmospheres are also in use. Vapors of formic acid and acetic acid are the most commonly used. Carbon monoxide and halogen gases (for example carbon tetrafluoride, sulfur hexafluoride, or dichlorodifluoromethane) require fairly high temperatures for several minutes to be effective.

Atomic hydrogen is much more reactive than molecular hydrogen. In contact with surface oxides it forms hydroxides, water, or hydrogenated complexes, which are volatile at soldering temperatures. A practical dissociation method is an electrical discharge. Argon-hydrogen gas compositions with hydrogen concentration below the low flammable limit can be used, eliminating the safety issues. The operation must be performed at low pressure, as the stability of atomic hydrogen at atmospheric pressure is insufficient. Such hydrogen plasma can be used for fluxless reflow soldering.

Active atmospheres are relatively common in furnace brazing; due to the high process temperatures the reactions are reasonably fast. The active ingredients are usually carbon monoxide (possibly in the form of combusted fuel gas) and hydrogen. Thermal dissociation of ammonia yields an inexpensive mixture of hydrogen and nitrogen.

Bombardment with atomic particle beams can remove surface layers at a rate of tens of nanometers per minute. The addition of hydrogen to the plasma augments the removal efficiency by chemical mechanisms.

Mechanical agitation is another possibility for disrupting the oxide layer. Ultrasound can be used for assisting tinning and soldering; an ultrasonic transducer can be mounted on the soldering iron, in a solder bath, or in the wave for wave soldering. The oxide disruption and removal involves cavitation effects between the molten solder and the base metal surface. A common application of ultrasound fluxing is in tinning of passive parts (active parts do not cope well with the mechanical stresses involved); even aluminium can be tinned this way. The parts can then be soldered or brazed conventionally.

Mechanical rubbing of a heated surface with molten solder can be used for coating the surface. Both surfaces to be joined can be prepared this way, then placed together and reheated. This technique was formerly used to repair small damages on aluminium aircraft skins.

A very thin layer of zinc can be used for joining aluminium parts. The parts must be perfectly machined, or pressed together, due to the small volume of filler metal. At high temperature applied for long time, the zinc diffuses away from the joint. The resulting joint does not present a mechanical weakness and is corrosion-resistant. The technique is known as diffusion soldering.

Fluxless brazing of copper alloys can be done with self-fluxing filler metals. Such metals contain an element capable of reaction with oxygen, usually phosphorus. A good example is the family of copper-phosphorus alloys.

== Properties ==
Fluxes have several important properties:

- Activity – the ability to dissolve existing oxides on the metal surface and promote wetting with solder. Highly active fluxes are often acidic or corrosive in nature.
- Corrosivity – the promotion of corrosion by the flux and its residues. Most active fluxes tend to be corrosive at room temperatures and require careful removal. As activity and corrosivity are linked, the preparation of surfaces to join should allow use of milder fluxes. Some water-soluble flux residues are hygroscopic, which causes problems with electrical resistance and contributes to corrosion. Fluxes containing halides and mineral acids are highly corrosive and require thorough removal. Some fluxes, especially those based on borax used for brazing, form very hard glass-like coatings that are difficult to remove.
- Cleanability – the difficulty of removal of flux and its residues after the soldering operation. Fluxes with higher content of solids tend to leave larger amount of residues; thermal decomposition of some vehicles also leads to formation of difficult-to-clean, polymerized and possibly even charred deposits (a problem especially for hand soldering). Some flux residues are soluble in organic solvents, others in water, some in both. Some fluxes are no-clean, as they are sufficiently volatile or undergo thermal decomposition to volatile products, that they do not require the cleaning step. Other fluxes leave non-corrosive residues that can be left in place. However, flux residues can interfere with subsequent operations; they can impair adhesion of conformal coatings, or act as undesired insulation on connectors and contact pads for test equipment.
- Residue tack – the stickiness of the surface of the flux residue. When not removed, the flux residue should have smooth, hard surface. Tacky surfaces tend to accumulate dust and particulates, which causes issues with electrical resistance; the particles themselves can be conductive or they can be hygroscopic or corrosive.
- Volatility – this property must be balanced to facilitate easy removal of solvents during the preheating phase but to not require too frequent replenishing of solvent in the process equipment.
- Viscosity – especially important for solder pastes, which must be easy to apply but also thick enough to stay in place without spreading to undesired locations. Solder pastes may also function as a temporary adhesive for keeping electronic parts in place before and during soldering. Fluxes applied by e.g. foam require low viscosity.
- Flammability – relevant especially for glycol-based vehicles and for organic solvents. Flux vapors tend to have low autoignition temperature and present a risk of a flash fire when the flux comes in contact with a hot surface.
- Solids – the percentage of solid material in the flux. Fluxes with low solids, sometimes as little as 1–2%, are called low solids flux, low-residue flux, or no clean flux. They are often composed of weak organic acids, with addition of small amount of rosin or other resins.
- Conductivity – some fluxes remain conductive after soldering if not cleaned properly, leading to random malfunctions on circuits with high impedances. Different types of fluxes are differently prone to cause these issues.

== Composition ==
=== Fluxes for metal joining ===
The composition of fluxes is tailored for the required properties—the base metals and their surface preparation (which determine the composition and thickness of surface oxides), the solder (which determines the wetting properties and the soldering temperature), the corrosion resistance and ease of removal, and others.

Fluxes for soft soldering are typically of organic nature, though inorganic fluxes, usually based on halogenides or acids, are also used in non-electronics applications. Fluxes for brazing operate at significantly higher temperatures and are therefore mostly inorganic; the organic compounds tend to be of supplementary nature, e.g., to make the flux sticky at low temperature so it can be easily applied.

The surface of the tin-based solder is coated predominantly with tin oxides; even in alloys the surface layer tends to become relatively enriched by tin. Fluxes for indium and zinc based solders have different compositions than fluxes for ordinary tin-lead and tin-based solders, due to different soldering temperatures and different chemistry of the oxides involved.

Organic fluxes are unsuitable for flame soldering and flame brazing, as they tend to char and impair solder flow.

Some metals are classified as "unsolderable" in air, and must be either coated with another metal before soldering or joined with special fluxes or protective atmospheres. Such metals are beryllium, chromium, magnesium, titanium, and some aluminium alloys.

Fluxes for high-temperature soldering differ from the fluxes for use at lower temperatures. At higher temperatures even relatively mild chemicals have sufficient oxide-disrupting activity, but the metal oxidation rates become fairly high; the barrier function of the vehicle therefore becomes more important than the fluxing activity. High molecular weight hydrocarbons are often used for this application; a diluent with a lower molecular weight, boiling off during the preheat phase, is usually used to aid application.

Common fluxes are ammonium chloride or resin acids (contained in rosin) for soldering copper and tin; hydrochloric acid and zinc chloride for soldering galvanized iron (and other zinc surfaces); and borax for brazing, braze-welding ferrous metals, and forge welding.

=== Organic fluxes ===
Organic fluxes typically consist of four major components:

- Activators – chemicals disrupting/dissolving the metal oxides. Their role is to expose unoxidized, easily wettable metal surface and aid soldering by other means, e.g. by exchange reactions with the base metals.
  - Highly active fluxes contain chemicals that are corrosive at room temperature. The compounds used include metal halides (most often zinc chloride or ammonium chloride), hydrochloric acid, phosphoric acid, citric acid, and hydrobromic acid. Salts of mineral acids with amines are also used as aggressive activators. Aggressive fluxes typically facilitate corrosion, require careful removal, and are unsuitable for finer work. Activators for fluxes for soldering and brazing aluminium often contain fluorides.
  - Milder activators begin to react with oxides only at elevated temperature. Typical compounds used are carboxylic acids (e.g. fatty acids (most often oleic acid and stearic acid), dicarboxylic acids) and sometimes amino acids. Some milder fluxes also contain halides or organohalides.
- Vehicles – high-temperature tolerant chemicals in the form of non-volatile liquids or solids with suitable melting point; they are generally liquid at soldering temperatures. Their role is to act as an oxygen barrier to protect the hot metal surface against oxidation, to dissolve the reaction products of activators and oxides and carry them away from the metal surface, and to facilitate heat transfer. Solid vehicles tend to be based on natural or modified rosin (mostly abietic acid, pimaric acid, and other resin acids) or natural or synthetic resins. Water-soluble organic fluxes tend to contain vehicles based on high-boiling polyols - glycols, diethylene glycol and higher polyglycols, polyglycol-based surfactants and glycerol.
- Solvents – added to facilitate processing and deposition to the joint. Solvents are typically dried out during preheating before the soldering operation; incomplete solvent removal may lead to boiling off and spattering of solder paste particles or molten solder.
- Additives – numerous other chemicals modifying the flux properties. Additives can be surfactants (especially nonionic), corrosion inhibitors, stabilizers and antioxidants, tackifiers, thickeners and other rheological modifiers (especially for solder pastes), plasticizers (especially for flux-cored solders), and dyes.

=== Inorganic fluxes ===
Inorganic fluxes contain components playing the same role as in organic fluxes. They are more often used in brazing and other high-temperature applications, where organic fluxes have insufficient thermal stability. The chemicals used often simultaneously act as both vehicles and activators; typical examples are borax, borates, fluoroborates, fluorides and chlorides. Halogenides are active at lower temperatures than borates, and are therefore used for brazing of aluminium and magnesium alloys; they are however highly corrosive.

=== Behavior of activators ===
The role of the activators is primarily disruption and removal of the oxide layer on the metal surface (and also the molten solder), to facilitate direct contact between the molten solder and metal. The reaction product is usually soluble or at least dispersible in the molten vehicle. The activators are usually either acids, or compounds that release acids at elevated temperature.

The general reaction of oxide removal is:

Metal oxide + Acid → Salt + Water

Salts are ionic in nature and can cause problems from metallic leaching or dendrite growth, with possible product failure. In some cases, particularly in high-reliability applications, flux residues must be removed.

The activity of the activator generally increases with temperature, up to a certain value where activity ceases, either due to thermal decomposition or excessive volatilization. However the oxidation rate of the metals also increases with temperature.

At high temperatures, copper oxide reacts with hydrogen chloride to water-soluble and mechanically weak copper chloride, and with rosin to salts of copper and abietic acid, which is soluble in molten rosin.

Some activators may also contain metal ions, capable of exchange reaction with the underlying metal; such fluxes aid soldering by chemically depositing a thin layer of easier solderable metal on the exposed base metal. An example is the group of fluxes containing zinc, tin or cadmium compounds, usually chlorides, sometimes fluorides or fluoroborates.

=== Inorganic activators ===
Common high-activity activators are mineral acids, often together with halides, amines, water or alcohols:

- hydrochloric acid, most common
- phosphoric acid, less common, use limited by its polymerization at higher temperatures

Inorganic acids are highly corrosive to metals even at room temperature, which causes issues during storage, handling and applications. As soldering involves high temperatures, compounds that decompose or react, with acids as products, are frequently used:

- zinc chloride, which at high temperatures reacts with moisture, forming oxychloride and hydrochloric acid
- ammonium chloride, thermally decomposing to ammonia and hydrochloric acid
- amine hydrochlorides, decomposing to the amine and hydrochloric acid

== Rosin fluxes ==
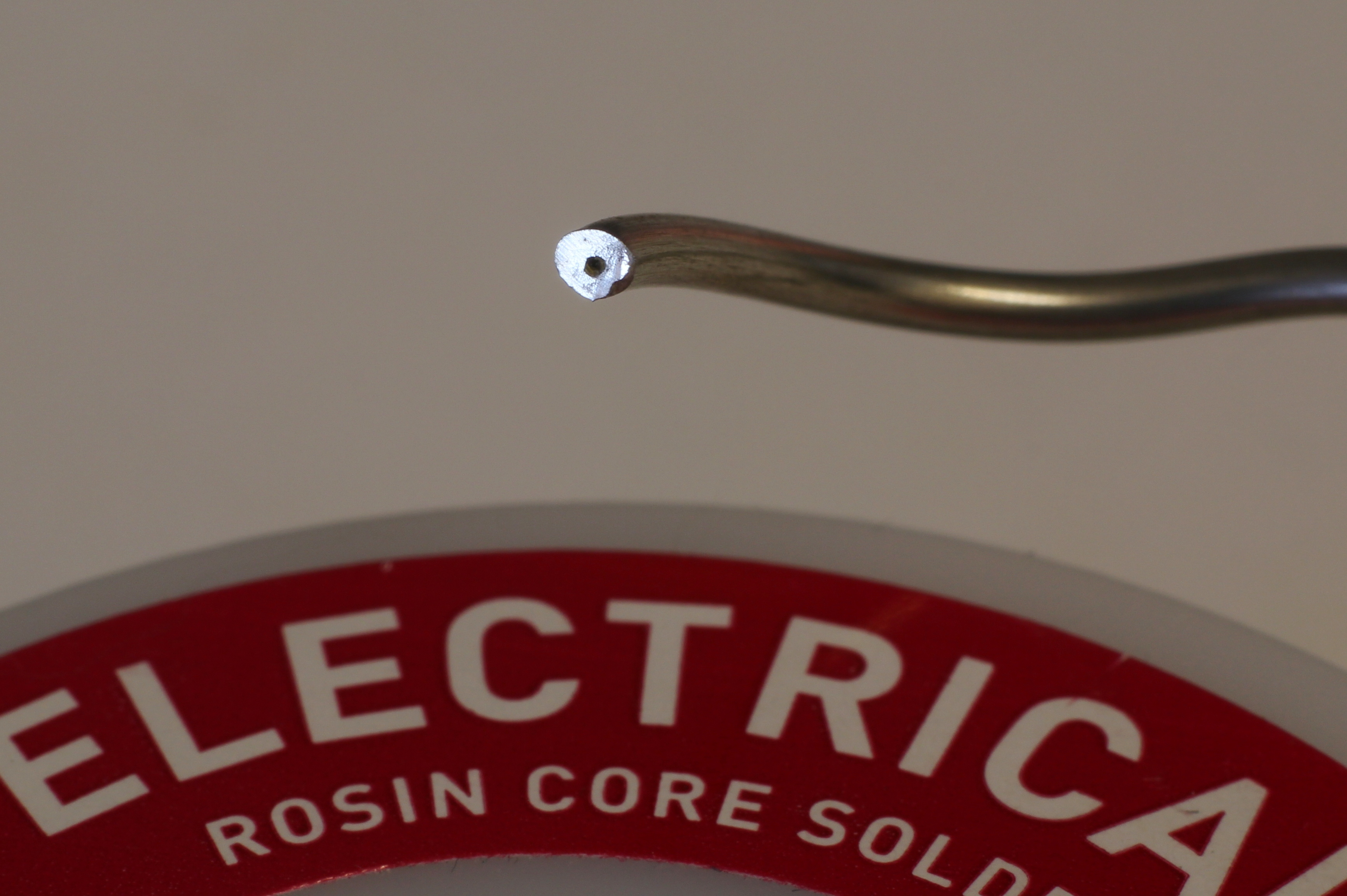
Electrical solder with a rosin core, visible as a dark spot in the cut end of the solder wire.

The terms resin flux and rosin flux are ambiguous and somewhat interchangeable, with different vendors using different assignments. Generally, fluxes are labeled as rosin if the vehicle they are based on is primarily natural rosin. Some manufactures reserve "rosin" designation for military fluxes based on rosin (R, RMA and RA compositions) and label others as "resin".

Rosin has good flux properties. A mixture of organic acids (resin acids, predominantly abietic acid, with pimaric acid, isopimaric acid, neoabietic acid, dihydroabietic acid, and dehydroabietic acid), rosin is a glassy solid, virtually nonreactive and noncorrosive at normal temperature, but liquid, ionic and mildly reactive to metal oxides at molten state. Rosin tends to soften between 60–70 °C and is fully fluid at around 120 °C; molten rosin is weakly acidic and is able to dissolve thinner layers of surface oxides from copper without further additives. For heavier surface contamination or improved process speed, additional activators can be added.

There are several possible activator groups for rosins:

- halide activators (organic halide salts, e.g. dimethylammonium chloride and diethylammonium chloride)
- organic acids (monocarboxylic, e.g. formic acid, acetic acid, propionic acid, and dicarboxylic, e.g. oxalic acid, malonic acid, sebacic acid)

There are three types of rosin: gum rosin (from pine tree oleoresin), wood rosin (obtained by extraction of tree stumps), and tall oil rosin (obtained from tall oil, a byproduct of kraft paper process). Gum rosin has a milder odor and lower tendency to crystallize from solutions than wood rosin, and is therefore preferred for flux applications. Tall oil rosin finds increased use due to its higher thermal stability and therefore lower tendency to form insoluble thermal decomposition residues. The composition and quality of rosin differs by the tree type, and also by location and even by year. In Europe, rosin for fluxes is usually obtained from a specific type of Portuguese pine; in America a North Carolina variant is used.

Natural rosin can be used as is, or can be chemically modified by e.g. esterification, polymerization, or hydrogenation. The properties being altered are increased thermal stability, better cleanability, altered solution viscosity, and harder residue (or conversely, softer and more tacky residue). Rosin can be also converted to a water-soluble rosin flux, by formation of an ethoxylated rosin amine, an adduct with a polyglycol and an amine.

One of the early fluxes was a mixture of equal amounts of rosin and vaseline. A more aggressive early composition was a mixture of saturated solution of zinc chloride, alcohol, and glycerol.

Fluxes can be also prepared from synthetic resins, often based on esters of polyols and fatty acids. Such resins have improved fume odor and lower residue tack, but their fluxing activity and solubility tend to be lower than that of natural resins.

=== Rosin flux grades ===
Rosin fluxes are categorized by grades of activity: L for low, M for moderate, and H for high. There are also other abbreviations for different rosin flux grades:

- R (Rosin) – pure rosin, no activators, low activity, mildest
- WW (water-white) – purest rosin grade, no activators, low activity, sometimes synonymous with R
- RMA (rosin mildly activated) - contains mild activators, typically no halides
- RA (rosin activated) – rosin with strong activators, high activity, contains halides
- OA (organic acid) – rosin activated with organic acids, high activity, highly corrosive, aqueous cleaning
- SA (synthetically activated) – rosin with strong synthetic activators, high activity; formulated to be easily soluble in organic solvents (chlorofluorocarbons, alcohols) to facilitate cleaning
- WS (water-soluble) – usually based on inorganic or organic halides; highly corrosive residues
- SRA (superactivated rosin) – rosin with very strong activators, very high activity
- IA (inorganic acid) – rosin activated with inorganic acids (usually hydrochloric acid or phosphoric acid), highest activities, highly corrosive

R, WW, and RMA grades are used for joints that can not be easily cleaned or where there is too high corrosion risk. More active grades require thorough cleaning of the residues. Improper cleaning can actually aggravate the corrosion by releasing trapped activators from the flux residues.

== Special fluxes ==
=== Fluxes for soldering certain metals ===
Some materials are very difficult to solder. In some cases special fluxes must be used.

==== Aluminum and its alloys ====
Aluminium and its alloys are difficult to solder due to the formation of the passivation layer of aluminium oxide. The flux must be able to disrupt this layer and facilitate wetting by solder. Salts or organic complexes of some metals can be used; the salt must be able to penetrate the cracks in the oxide layer. The metal ions, more noble than aluminium, then undergo a redox reaction, dissolve the surface layer of aluminium and form a deposit there. This intermediate layer of another metal then can be wetted with a solder.

One example of such flux is a composition of triethanolamine, fluoroboric acid, and cadmium fluoroborate. More than 1% magnesium in the alloy impairs the flux action, however, as the magnesium oxide layer is more refractory. Another possibility is an inorganic flux composed of zinc chloride or tin(II) chloride, ammonium chloride, and a fluoride (e.g. sodium fluoride). Presence of silicon in the alloy impairs the flux effectivity, as silicon does not undergo the exchange reaction aluminium does.

==== Magnesium alloys ====
Magnesium alloys. A putative flux for soldering these alloys at low temperature is molten acetamide. Acetamide dissolves surface oxides on both aluminium and magnesium; promising experiments were done with its use as a flux for a tin-indium solder on magnesium.

==== Stainless steel ====
Stainless steel is difficult to solder because of its stable, self-healing surface oxide layer and its low thermal conductivity. A solution of zinc chloride in hydrochloric acid is a common flux for stainless steels. The residue must, however, be thoroughly removed afterwards to prevent pitting corrosion. Another highly effective flux is phosphoric acid—but its tendency to polymerize at higher temperatures limits its applications.

=== Metal salts as flux in hot corrosion ===
Hot corrosion can affect gas turbines operating in high salt environments (e.g., near the ocean). Salts, including chlorides and sulfates, are ingested by the turbines and deposited in the hot sections of the engine; other elements present in fuels also form salts, e.g. vanadates. The heat from the engine melts these salts, which then can flux the passivating oxide layers on the metal components of the engine, allowing corrosion to occur at an accelerated rate.

== List of fluxes ==
- Borax – for brazing
- Beeswax
- Citric acid – for soldering copper/electronics
- Tallow and lead
- Paraffin wax
- Palm oil
- Zinc chloride ("killed spirits")
- Zinc chloride and ammonium chloride
- Olive oil and ammonium chloride – for iron
- Rosin, tallow, olive oil, and zinc chloride – for aluminium
- Cryolite (sodium hexafluoroaluminate)
- Cryolite and phosphoric acid
- Phosphoric acid and alcohol
- Cryolite and barium chloride
- Oleic acid
- Lithium chloride
- Magnesium chloride
- Sodium chloride
- Potassium chloride
- Unslaked lime

== Flux recovery ==
During the submerged arc welding process, not all flux turns into slag. Depending on the welding process, 50% to 90% of the flux can be reused.

== Standards ==
Solder fluxes are specified according to several standards.

=== ISO 9454-1 and DIN EN 29454-1 ===
The most common standard in Europe is ISO 9454-1 (also known as DIN EN 29454-1).

This standard specifies each flux by a four-character code: flux type, base, activator, and form. The form is often omitted.

Flux type	Base	Activator	Form
1 Resin	1 Rosin; 2 Without rosin	1 Without activator; 2 Halide activator; 3 Non-halide activator	A Liquid; B Solid; C Paste
2 Organic	1 Water-soluble; 2 Water-insoluble	1 Without activator; 2 Halide activator; 3 Non-halide activator	A Liquid; B Solid; C Paste
3 Inorganic	1 Salts	1 Ammonium chloride; 2 Without ammonium chloride	A Liquid; B Solid; C Paste
3 Inorganic	2 Acids	1 Phosphoric acid; 2 Other acids	A Liquid; B Solid; C Paste
3 Inorganic	3 Alkaline	1 Amines and/or ammonia	A Liquid; B Solid; C Paste

Therefore, 1.1.2 means rosin flux with halides.

=== DIN 8511 ===
The older German DIN 8511 specification is still often in use in shops. In the table below, note that the correspondence between DIN 8511 and ISO 9454-1 codes is not one-to-one.

Residues	DIN 8511	ISO 9454-1	Description
Strongly corrosive	F-SW-11	3.2.2	Inorganic acid other than phosphoric
Strongly corrosive	F-SW-12	3.1.1	Ammonium chloride
Strongly corrosive	F-SW-13	3.2.1	Phosphoric acid
Weakly corrosive	F-SW-21	3.1.1	Ammonium chloride
Weakly corrosive	F-SW-22	3.1.2	Inorganic salts without ammonium chloride
Weakly corrosive	F-SW-23	2.1.3	Organic water-soluble without halides
Weakly corrosive	F-SW-23	2.2.1	Organic water-insoluble without activators
Weakly corrosive	F-SW-23	2.2.3	Organic water-insoluble without halides
Weakly corrosive	F-SW-24	2.1.1	Organic water-soluble without activators
Weakly corrosive	F-SW-24	2.1.3	Organic water-soluble without halides
Weakly corrosive	F-SW-24	2.2.3	Organic water-insoluble without halides
Weakly corrosive	F-SW-25	2.1.2	Organic water-soluble with halides
Weakly corrosive	F-SW-25	2.2.2	Organic water-insoluble with halides
Weakly corrosive	F-SW-26	1.1.2	Rosin with halides
Weakly corrosive	F-SW-27	1.1.3	Rosin without halides
Weakly corrosive	F-SW-28	1.2.2	Rosin-free resin with halides
Non-corrosive	F-SW-31	1.1.1	Rosin without activators
Non-corrosive	F-SW-32	1.1.3	Rosin without halides
Non-corrosive	F-SW-33	1.2.3	Rosin-free resin without halides
Non-corrosive	F-SW-34	2.2.3	Organic water-insoluble without halides

=== J-STD-004 ===
One standard increasingly used (e.g. in the United States) is J-STD-004. It is very similar to DIN EN 61190-1-1.

Four characters (two letters, then one letter, and last a number) represent flux composition, flux activity, and whether activators include halides:

- First two letters: Base
  - RO: rosin
  - RE: resin
  - OR: organic
  - IN: inorganic
- Third letter: Activity
  - L: low
  - M: moderate
  - H: high
- Number: Halide content
  - 0: less than 0.05% in weight (“halide-free”)
  - 1: halide content depends on activity:
    - less than 0.5% for low activity
    - 0.5% to 2.0% for moderate activity
    - greater than 2.0% for high activity

Any combination is possible, e.g. ROL0, REM1 or ORH0.

J-STD-004 characterizes the flux by reliability of residue from a surface insulation resistance (SIR) and electromigration standpoint. It includes tests for electromigration and surface insulation resistance (which must be greater than 100 MΩ after 168 hours at elevated temperature and humidity with a DC bias applied).

=== MIL-F-14256 and QQ-S-571 ===
The old MIL-F-14256 and QQ-S-571 standards defined fluxes as:

- R (rosin)
- RMA (rosin mildly activated)
- RA (rosin activated)
- WS (water-soluble)

Any of these categories may be no-clean, or not, depending on the chemistry selected and the standard that the manufacturer requires.

== See also ==
- Flux-cored arc welding
- Gas metal arc welding
- Shielded metal arc welding
