= Ultra-high-purity steam for oxidation and annealing =

Water vapor used in industrial processes

Ultra-high-purity steam, also called the clean steam, UHP steam or high purity water vapor, is used in a variety of industrial manufacturing processes that require oxidation or annealing. These processes include the growth of oxide layers on silicon wafers for the semiconductor industry, originally described by the Deal-Grove model, and for the formation of passivation layers used to improve the light capture ability of crystalline photovoltaic cells. Several methods and technologies can be employed to generate ultra high purity steam, including pyrolysis, bubbling, direct liquid injection, and purified steam generation. The level of purity, or the relative lack of contamination, affects the quality of the oxide layer or annealed surface. The method of delivery affects growth rate, uniformity, and electrical performance. Oxidation and annealing are common steps in the manufacture of such devices as microelectronics and solar cells.

== Characteristics ==
Steam is the gaseous state of water where the majority of the gas pressure is created by water molecules. This differs from humidified gas, where water vapor is a minor component of the gas mixture. Ideally, steam is composed only of H_{2}O molecules. However, steam may also contain other molecules such as metals, urea, volatiles, chlorine, particles, microdroplets, and organics in reality. To be considered ultra high purity, steam must not have contaminants above a certain limit. Typical values for semiconductor are at part per billion (ppb) for any specific contaminant by volume. This is an arbitrary definition and is frequently set by the user.

Impurities in water are entrained into the steam as it is generated, and more may migrate into the steam from process piping materials as it is conducted to the process. These impurities or contaminants can be quite harmful when the steam is an ingredient in industrial manufacturing processes. As microelectronic device size and geometry shrink, the susceptibility to damage from contaminants grows. This requires intervention through the use of filters, selective membranes or other techniques to clean the water or steam before delivery to process.

- Metals: Metals can be in the source water or gases and can migrate into the steam from components in the steam generation and delivery path. Metallic systems corrode and impart metallic ions. Stainless steel, for example, can slough off molecules into the steam path. Limiting or eliminating metals from the water, gas and steam delivery paths reduce the risk of metallic contamination but do not affect the presence of metals in the source water and gas. Metal ions degrade electrical performance in semiconductors and metal ions in solar cells can be recombination centers that reduce the efficiency of the photovoltaic device.
- Urea: Fertilizers, auto emissions, and human and animal sources contribute to the presence of urea and ammonia. Normally stable at room temperature, Urea has a high conversion rate to Ammonia when boiled. This contaminant is difficult to control, varies with the water supply and has large seasonal fluctuations. Urea is not easily rejected by reverse osmosis membranes. It is non-polar, so not removed by de-ionized water processes, and chemically stable so not easily destroyed by UV sterilization processes. Controlling Ammonia levels makes the difference between conformity and uncontrolled variation. For example, "T-Topping" in lithography is a real danger, resulting from chemically amplified resists. Other structural defects caused by ammonia include incorrectly imprinted line width and short circuits, and ammonia can also deposit on optical surfaces, causing equipment downtime. Residual urea on the wafer surface can react when wafers are processed at higher temperatures leading to the injection of nitrogen atoms into the layer being grown.
- Silica: Colloidal silica is typically found in surface waters and has created problems for water treatment because of its stability as an un-ionized compound, making it difficult to remove using ion exchange processes. Particle size is often 1 to 5 nm, but can form chains if concentrations increase. Silica is at the lower end of selectivity for anion resins, creating a scenario where silica breakthrough is one of the first to occur. As a result, silica can be effectively removed only if the ion exchange resins are completely and properly regenerated.
- Oxygen: If oxygen makes up part of the process recipe during wet oxidation, it will reduce the water vapor partial pressure, slowing the overall growth rate. Because the oxidation rate of silicon with oxygen molecules to water molecules is almost ten times slower, variability in the oxygen to water vapor pressure can lead to process variability. This is frequently a problem when the operating pressure is kept at ambient pressure. Water vapor pressure is a function of the temperature of the water source while the overall process pressure is a function of atmosphere. As the atmosphere varies the oxygen pressure will increase or decrease relative to the water vapor pressure, leading to changes in the overall oxidation growth rate of the film.
- Microdroplets: Water vapor with entrained water microdroplets can cause deformities or irregularities in wafers as the water settles on hot surfaces. Microdroplets are the result of incomplete vaporization of the water source. This is common with boiling and vaporizers where it is difficult to get sufficient heat into the boiling liquid. These microdroplets can cause contamination and problems in uniformity. The boiling action of water creates microdroplets, which act as liquid capsules that entrain particles and molecular contaminants such as ions, organics, and pyrogens. Microdroplets are known to carry particulate and ionic impurities that cannot be carried by pure vapor alone. Furthermore, cold spots occur where microdroplets land leading to non-uniformity and warpage. In order for oxide films to work properly, the film thickness and uniformity are critical.

== The role of UHP steam in oxidation ==
Oxidation of silicon is a common and frequent step in the manufacture of integrated circuits (IC). The goal of oxidation is to grow a high quality, uniform oxide layer on a silicon substrate. During oxidation, a chemical reaction between the oxidants and the silicon atoms produces a layer of oxide on the silicon surface of the wafer. It is often the first step in wafer fabrication and will be repeated multiple times throughout the fabrication process.

Oxidation takes place in an oxidation tube. During the reaction, silicon reacts with oxidants to form silicon oxide layers. Typical operating temperature is between 800 °C and 1,200 °C. The oxide growth rate increases with temperature.

Growth rate, uniformity and yield are three important characteristics of the oxidation process. The faster the growth rate, the more wafers that can be manufactured in a given time. If the oxidation process is uniform across the tube—both horizontally and vertically—then the process will be complete at the same time across all wafers and the yield will be high. However, if the process is non-uniform, then intervention is required, increasing the process time and potentially reducing yield. In addition, fast growth rate can increase the defect rate, especially if contaminants are present.

During the first stage of oxidation, the chemical reaction results from the direct contact between silicon and oxidants at the wafer surface. The reaction is limited by the number of silicon atoms available. For approximately the first 500 Å, the oxide grows linearly with time. From that point on, the reaction rate slows down because the silicon dioxide layer covers the silicon atoms. As the silicon dioxide layer grows, it eventually prevents the oxidants from coming in direct contact with the silicon atoms.

The second stage begins when approximately 1,000 Å of silicon dioxide has been grown on the silicon substrate. At this point, the silicon atoms are no longer exposed to the oxidants and the oxidants begin to diffuse through the silicon dioxide in order to reach the silicon. The oxidation of silicon during this stage occurs at the silicon/silicon dioxide interface. As oxidation continues, the silicon dioxide layer thickens, and the distance the oxidants must travel to reach the silicon increases. The oxide growth rate is limited by the diffusion of the oxidants through silicon dioxide.

There are two methods of oxidation: dry oxidation and wet oxidation. During dry oxidation, dry oxygen is introduced into the process tube where it reacts with silicon. Dry oxidation is a slow process that grows films at a rate between 140 and 250 Å/hour. It is typically only used to grow thin oxides (<1000 Å). During wet oxidation, water vapor is introduced into the heated oxidation tube. Because water molecules form hydroxyl structures, they diffuse faster in silicon dioxide and the oxide growth rate increases. The wet oxidation growth rate is 1000 to 1200 Ǻ/hour, so wet oxidation is the preferred method to grow thick oxides. The growth rate slows with increasing thickness, according to the Deal-Grove model.

Water vapor is a key ingredient in the wet oxidation recipe. During a typical process, a furnace containing multiple wafers is flooded with water vapor. The oxygen in the water molecule reacts within the silicon wafer to form silicon dioxide. This is a sacrificial process, where the original substrate is reduced as the oxide forms on its surface.

When water vapor pressure is increased, the oxide growth rate is increased. According to the model of Deal and Grove[4], the growth rate of the oxide layer is directly related to the effective diffusion coefficient of the water molecules into the oxide layer and the equilibrium concentration in the immediate area. When a carrier gas is used to deliver water vapor, the carrier gas molecules generate a partial pressure. This partial pressure lowers the partial pressure of water vapor and slows the diffusion of water into the oxide film. The result is lower driving force and slower growth rate.

For a given temperature and process pressure, oxide growth rates are fixed if the gas ratio is also constant. However, for a given operating temperature, this growth rate is not maximized until the water vapor pressure is equal to 100% of the operating pressure. While increasing water vapor flow rate seems obvious to improve growth rates, technical difficulties interfere with increasing the actual quantity of delivered water vapor.

== The role of UHP steam in annealing and passivation ==
Some deposition methods are faster than others, which saves process time but can lead to less dense film. To improve the density and heal the film, annealing can be applied. Annealing and passivation are techniques used to repair atomic defects within the crystal that propagate into the wafer macrostructure, reducing efficiencies in microelectronics and photovoltaic cells. High temperature annealing can increase carrier lifetimes by injecting H into the Si/SiO_{2} interface. Passivation, or thermal annealing, of the interface limits hole/electron recombination, removes dangling bonds, and reduces vacancies and dislocations at grain boundaries.

Annealing typically involves heating the wafer and saturating the chamber with a gas or water vapor that can then be incorporated into the film. Hydrogen is sourced from H_{2}, H+ radicals from plasma, or H_{2}O water vapor. The three common techniques are hydrogen plasma anneal, forming gas anneal, or high temperature steam anneal. Traditional methods used Hydrogen Radical Annealing (HRA), which uses hydrogen gas and microwave energy. Forming Gas Annealing (FGA) uses H_{2} at 400–500 °C. A new approach is the use of High Temperature Steam Annealing (HSA), which uses water vapor at 250–400 °C.

In HSA, water vapor applied in a furnace can improve the density of oxides without the use of hydrogen. The steam readily inserts H and O atoms into the Si/SiO_{2} interface, and is much faster than FGA and comparable to the HRA process. Without the plasma, the device is subjected to less structural damage and obtains higher effective carrier lifetimes. The process is much simpler than a plasma process, and is both less expensive and safer.

An effective passivation of the rear surface of industrial solar cells is a prerequisite to considerably improve the conversion efficiency. An excellent level of surface passivation on lowly doped p-type surfaces is provided by thermal grown silicon oxides. However, dry thermal oxidation processes require relatively high temperatures (>1000 °C) and, due to the low growth rate, long process times. To decrease both oxidation temperature and process time the dry oxidation process can be replaced by a wet oxidation followed by nitrogen annealing. Best cell performance requires a forming gas anneal after firing.

== Industrial uses ==
Ultra-high-purity steam is used in key industries including semiconductors, photovoltaics, MEMS and nanotechnology. Water vapor plays an important role in deposition processes, as well as in annealing, release etching and bonding. Water vapor can be the source of oxygen for the generation of oxides as well as a humidifier for dry gases in sputtering, spin-on and ALD processes. In the semiconductor and MEMS industries, Rapid Thermal Processing (RTP) and Diffusion need high flow rates of water vapor for short periods of time. The move to larger wafers and higher throughputs has only increased these flow requirements.

Atomic layer deposition (ALD) depends on very small amounts of water vapor for High-K film formation. The technique requires the proper molecule be available and not replaced by competitive species that will disrupt the lattice structure. Temperature control of both the gas and water, as well as level control, affect delivery rate. ALD is increasingly popular for creating thin films for gate dielectrics, capacitor dielectrics and diffusion barriers. Contamination is a high risk in this process because ALD is slower and performed at lower temperatures.

Plasma stripping is more effective with water vapor to help lift the film of the wafer surface.

Immersion Lithography has been generally accepted as the lithography technology for the next several silicon generations. Impurities in the water such as dissolved gases and ionic salts can change the index of refraction, which directly affects image quality projected onto the wafer.

Immersion lithography places a layer of pure water between the projection lens and the wafer. Any contaminant within the water can lead to change in refractive index and a project defect on the wafer. Micro-bubbles in the water can also lead to project defects on the wafer.

Water vapor also plays an important role in Carbon NanoTube (CNT) fabrication. The technology required to improve CNT growth rate and uniformity faces major hurdles in its transfer from research to production. For repeatable and reliable CNT fabrication, tools are needed to control whether CNTs are single or multi-wall, straight or bent, long or short, and clean or dirty. Water vapor is pivotal to the process. Precise delivery of water vapor will determine what the CNT looks like, what its yield is, and how contamination free the structure is.

Water vapor has been shown to have significant effect on thin film layers in ALD, MOCVD, and sputtering processes for the manufacture of photovoltaics. Such processes are commonly used to generate TCO layers and modify crystal structures via grain size or defect repair. The ability to deliver water vapor free from atmospheric contaminants is critical to film integrity.

== Generation and delivery ==
The ideal water vapor for industrial manufacturing processes is extremely pure, moderate in temperature and free of extra oxygen or water microdroplets. In addition, this water vapor is ideally delivered in a range of flow rates from standard cubic centimeters per minute (sccm) to standard litre per minute (slm), into vacuum or atmosphere pressure environments for days or weeks at a time.

Purity is paramount in avoiding contamination. Purity can be achieved by blending pure gases under high heat or by purifying water vapor as it is generated. In either case, the piping and instrumentation must be carefully chosen to avoid adding metals, particles or other contaminants back into the water vapor.

Temperature is important for several reasons. High temperature (in excess of 1100 °C) introduces greater safety issues. It also risks uneven heating in the chamber that can lead to problems with uniformity. If water vapor is generated at very high temperatures, it must be cooled before coming in contact with the furnace and wafers. Variation in temperature across the furnace tube can cause problems in uniformity.

Depending on the application, water vapor may be required in very small or rather large increments. Ideally, the water vapor can be regulated to deliver the precise volume to the furnace or to the gas it is humidifying. This precision allows processes to run at optimal efficiency.

Similarly, different applications may require the water vapor to be delivered at vacuum or atmosphere pressures. Meeting this requirement allows the process to be most efficient. When growing oxides, increasing the water vapor pressure in the process gas environment will increase the oxidation growth rate.

Delivery of water vapor must be highly reliable for a long period of time. It is not unusual for processes to run for days or weeks. If water vapor delivery fails, the wafer may be compromised.

As an ingredient in industrial manufacturing processes, the steam must be generated and delivered at a consistent, controllable flow rate and have an extremely low contamination level. Several technologies can be combined to generate, purify and deliver steam.

=== Catalytic and pyrolytic steam ===
Pyrolytic steam is often used to generate oxide thicknesses greater than 1000 angstroms. This steam is generated from the combination at high temperature of hydrogen and oxygen gases. The combustion process occurs either in a stainless steel catalytic oven or on a silicon torch at the entrance to the furnace. The gases combine into water vapor and are delivered directly to process. Because of the explosive risk associated with hydrogen, the process usually delivers an extra 10% oxygen flow. The purity level of pyrolytic steam depends on the purity of the process gases and the process temperature. The torch tip is typically quartz silica, which is known to be consumed over time by the flame, which may generate particulate downstream. Particle generation can also be an issue due to the velocity of high temperature combustion. Within its optimal operating range, torches deliver good purity.

Pyrolytic systems can support a middle range of flow but have a difficult time with very low flow rates and low steam to hydrogen ratios when adding water vapor to a carrier gas. Also, thermal management of the heat profile of the furnace and incomplete combustion affect furnace performance.

In selective oxidation processes, water vapor is needed with hydrogen and without molecular to oxygen. This allows for the oxidation of specific metals. Torches and catalytic system are not 100% efficient so low levels of oxygen may still enter the processes. 50 ppm oxygen may be sufficient to degrade the selective oxidation process.

Present catalytic systems are metallic and are not easily scalable due to thermal buildup in the catalytic combustion cell. They use a metallic catalyst to combustion oxygen and hydrogen to water vapor.

To use pyrolytic steam, the facility must install hydrogen and oxygen supply lines or store and dispose of gas cylinders. Cooling water or compressed air to cool the torch must also be managed since combustion of hydrogen can generate temperatures approaching 2200 °C. Under controlled conditions, pyrolytic and catalytic steam technology offers good flow control and accuracy.

=== Bubblers ===
Bubblers are simple devices that add water vapor to a carrier gas stream as the carrier gas bubbles through a water vessel. The quality of this steam added to the carrier gas is a function of the water temperature, carrier gas temperature, height of the liquid head, and pressure of the carrier gas. These devices are safe, easy to use, simple to maintain and low cost. They provide basic purification through single step distillation. However, contaminants and bacteria can rapidly build up if not frequently cleaned out. Bubblers cannot prevent entrainment of dissolved gas, volatile molecular contaminants, and micro-droplets that can carry particulate and ionic molecular contaminants. Process repeatability is limited due to control of process variables as well as thermal droop within the vessel with time.

Purity depends chiefly on the quality of the source water, carrier gas and the components in the water and steam path. The water quality becomes a living history of contact with all piping materials as well as gases used for bubbling. The bubbling process is a single stage distillation step that concentrates contaminants in the remaining water in the vessel. These contaminants can be traced to the supply water and the carrier gas as well as the continuous leaching of contaminants from the vessel itself, which is commonly heated. House de-ionized water and secondary chemical filters and degassers are sometimes employed to reduce contaminants. Bubbler are susceptible to inaccurate flow due to the temperature of the gas, liquid, operating pressure, liquid level, and thermal droop.

Bubblers also have limited gas flow rates. To increase the delivery rate, the carrier gas flows need to be increased, slowing the diffusion of water vapor to the surface. The water cannot be heated near boiling or uncontrolled flow will result. If the flow rate exceeds a limited velocity, bubbles force the source liquid out of the vessel and into the downstream piping, in turn forcing the use of phase separators, which leads to increased particulate, condensation, and flow instability. Long term use of bubblers typically results in fouling if the water is not frequently changed. The effect of bubbling oxygen through clean water and kept warm by heating and incident IR leads to ideal conditions for growing bacteria. This leads to organic contamination in the film.

=== Vaporizers and direct liquid injection ===
Vaporizers atomize water and then combust the small droplets into molecular water. The heat of vaporization is very high and the ability to the get the energy to the water molecule is limited by the heater transfer rate through the vaporizer plate and the carrier gas that is mixed in with the water vapor. In addition, the water is aggressive and can corrode the vaporizer internal components, leading to long term stability and reliability issues.

DLI uses a metallic vaporizer or an additional metal hot plate to convert the liquid to gas. This process works best for mid-range flow rates. At low flow rates there is little control and limited accuracy, while at high flow rates the process is susceptible to bubbles in the liquid, which generate erratic values. DLI offers a low operating cost, good flow control and limited safety issues. DLI can vaporize only limited quantities due to thermal transfer rates, and there is a potential for chemical decomposition. Most critically, it cannot provide any purification of the liquid being vaporized; everything in the liquid is vaporized into the process. With direct liquid injection systems, increasing flow rate leads to incomplete vaporization. This increases micro droplet formation, which increases non-uniformity and ionic contamination on the wafer.

=== Membrane contactors ===
Membrane contactors allow gas transfer between a liquid and gas. They are made with hollow fiber membranes that are porous, allowing simultaneous transfer of the gas into the liquid and the liquid into the gas.

These systems are not specific to which gases can permeate so they have no purification capability. Because of the design, the carrier gas can permeate the liquid source. This can be problematic if the carrier gas is pyrophoric or toxic. The porous membranes cannot prevent the penetration of microdroplets across the hollow fiber into the carrier gas.

In addition the porous nature requires that operating pressures be carefully managed. This generally requires gas pressure be lower than the water source pressure. This can lead to severe process limits in design. Most hollow fibers are hydrophobic and must be modified to work with hydrophilic molecules.

=== Membrane purification steam ===
Purified steam relies on a combination of filtration, deionized water, controlled steam generation and a selective membrane process to deliver ultra high purity steam to process.

The selective membrane process solves many of the challenges for direct delivery of water vapor by changing the way water molecules are converted from liquid to gas phase. A nonporous hydrophilic membrane is used. Only charged species can enter the nano-sized pores of the membrane. Non-polar species and particles are rejected. Because while ions can enter the pores, they cannot leave since they are not volatile. Only volatile polar molecules can enter and exit the membrane pores. The smallest polar molecule is water.

Transfer across the membrane is restricted to single and small channel transfer rates. Once molecules cross the wall of the membrane, they are energized and ready to enter the gas phase based solely on the vapor pressure curve that relates to the temperature of the water. Using the membrane as the phase separator prevents water droplets from permeating the membrane and ensures very smooth and consistent flow.
