= KhN70Yu =

Russian heat-resistant nickel-chromium-aluminium alloy

KhN70Yu (Russian: ХН70Ю, also known by its experimental designation EI-652, Russian: ЭИ652) is a GOST-grade heat-resistant nickel-based alloy, containing about 27 wt% chromium and 3 wt% aluminium. The grade designation follows the standard Russian system: Х for chromium, Н70 for ≈70% nickel, and Ю for aluminium (Russian alyuminiy). It was first reported in 1957 by A. P. Boyarinova as an alloy designed for resistance-heating, rated for service up to ~1200 °C. The addition of chromium and aluminium makes it resist scaling at high temperatures.

Nominal composition per GOST 5632-72 (wt%)
Ni	Cr	Al	Fe	C
bal.	26 to 29	2.8 to 3.5	≤1.0	≤0.10

Documented uses include electrical heating elements, components of gas-handling and furnace equipment operating at 1100–1200 °C, and welded structural assemblies. Despite the alloy's high scaling resistance, it did not enter widespread industrial use, in part because its ductility drops sharply during 700–800 °C.
