= ROSE test =

The resistivity of solvent extract (ROSE) test is a test for the presence and average concentration of soluble ionic contaminants, for example on a printed circuit board (PCB). It was developed in the early 1970s. Some manufacturers use it as part of Six Sigma processes.

Some modern fluxes have low solubility in traditional ROSE solvents such as water and isopropyl alcohol, and therefore require the use of different solvents.
