= Scaling (metallurgy) =

Growth of an oxide layer on a metal at high temperature

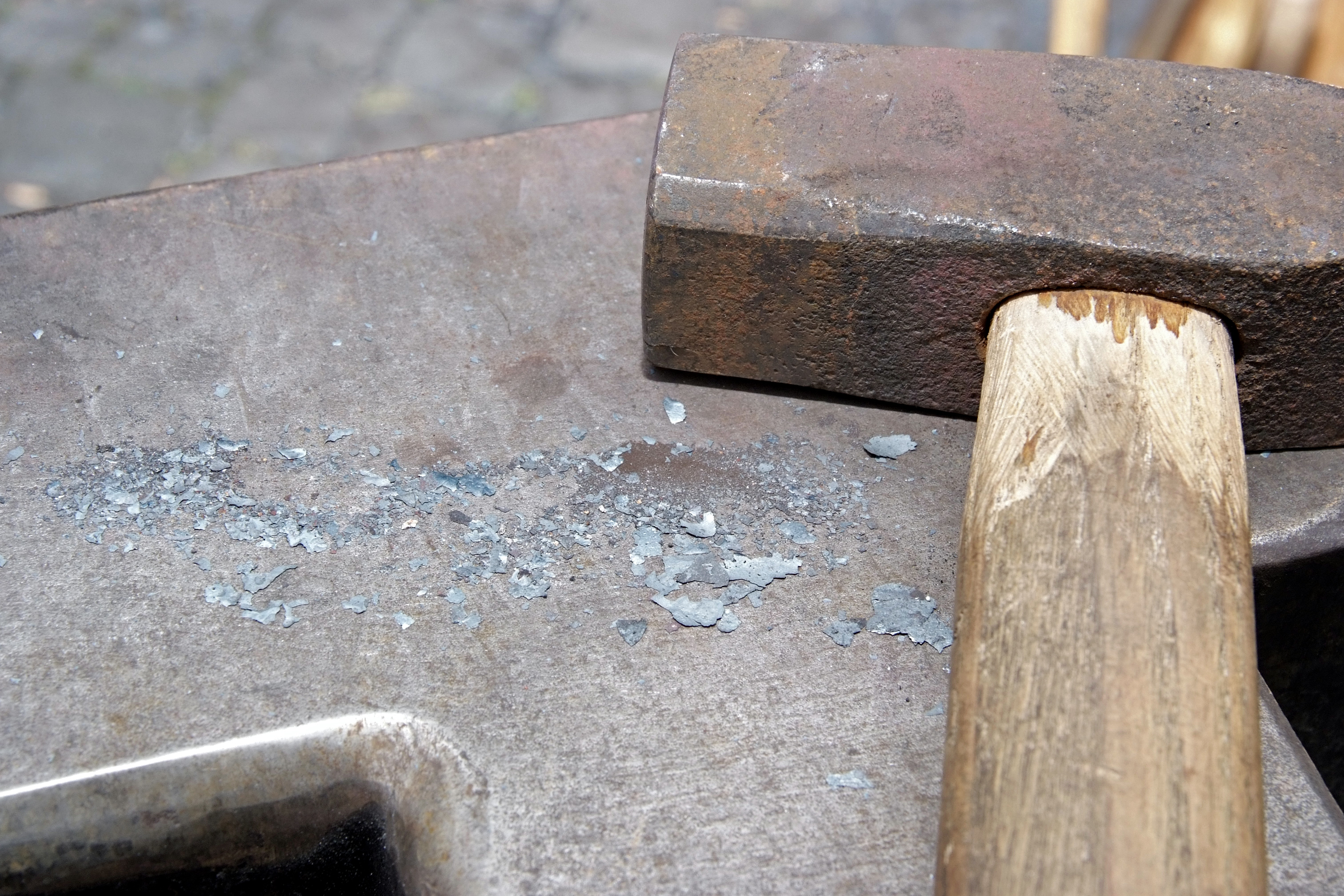
Mill scale on an anvil

In metallurgy, scaling (also called high-temperature oxidation) is the growth of a layer of oxide on a metal surface as a result of reaction with a hot oxidizing atmosphere. The oxide layer is itself called the scale. Scaling is one form of high-temperature corrosion, alongside sulfidation and carburization, in which the metal reacts instead with sulfur- or carbon-bearing atmospheres. A particular case of scaling is mill scale, which forms on hot-rolled steel.

Scaling differs from the fouling sense of "scale", in which mineral solids precipitate onto a surface from a fluid. For example, minerals like CaCO_{3} precipitate onto the inside of a metal pipe that carries hard water, which can then be chipped off into scale-shaped chunks. In metallurgical scaling, the material that builds up comes from oxidizing the metal itself, which is progressively consumed.

Scaling may remain intact and thicken slowly, which would protect the underlying material from further oxidation. Scaling may crack, fall off (spall), or thicken quickly, which would disrupt the underlying material. Material with good protective scaling property may have worse performance in other properties, such as mechanical properties (strength, creep resistance), fabricability (formability, weldability), cost, etc. Material engineers balance these criteria when designing material meant for high temperature applications.

== Kinetics ==
Three kinetic regimes are commonly observed.

When solid-state diffusion through the scale is rate-limiting, scale thickness $x$ grows as $x^2 = kt$, the parabolic rate law derived by Wagner in 1933. According to Wagner's theory, oxidation rate is controlled by partial ionic and electronic conductivities of oxides and their dependence on the chemical potential of the metal or oxygen in the oxide. Notably, this is the same law as that of a random walk. Wagner's theory is based on lattice diffusion, whereas the transport properties of slow-growing protective oxides are largely determined by their grain boundaries and possibly, microporosity, so a fully quantitative description of real protective scales remains empirical.

When a surface reaction or diffusion through the gas phase controls the rate, oxidation becomes linear in time at a constant rate. The scale thickness grows as $x = k_l t$.

For very thin films, roughly 2 to 4 nm, at low temperatures, oxidation follows a logarithmic law. Two forms are observed. The direct logarithmic law is $x = k_{\log}\,\log(t + t_0) + A$. The inverse logarithmic law is $x = (B - k_{il}\log t)^{-1}$. The inverse form was explained by Cabrera and Mott. Chemisorbed oxygen sets up an electric field across the thin film. The field accelerates ion migration through the oxide. As the film thickens, the field weakens, and the rate falls.

A material may have more than one regime. Niobium in air at about 1000 °C, for example, starts parabolic and transitions to linear at long times.

== Protective scaling ==
Scaling may be protective, or destructive. In protective scaling, the scaling layer grows slowly, and does not spall, crack, or flake off. In destructive scaling, the opposite is true. Whether a material has protective scaling is largely empirical, but several factors have been identified.

=== Growth stresses ===
Schematic sketch of how the oxide structure changes according to the PBR. A PBR of around 1 is compatible with protective scaling.

The growing scale rarely forms without internal stress. Birks, Meier & Pettit (2006) identify seven mechanisms that generate growth stresses.

1. Volume difference between the oxide and the metal it consumes. The Pilling-Bedworth ratio (PBR) is the volume of oxide produced per unit volume of metal consumed. PBR < 1 (as for potassium, magnesium, sodium) puts the oxide in tension. Oxide layers in tension tend to be discontinuous and unprotective. PBR > 1 puts the oxide in compression. This is the case for most engineering metals. Moderate compression is compatible with a protective scale, but very high compression can cause the scale to spall when the stored elastic strain energy exceeds the interface fracture resistance.
2. Epitaxial mismatch. The first oxide layer grown on the metal is forced into crystallographic alignment with the metal lattice, which is different from the oxide's natural lattice spacing. This creates tensile or compressive stress. This matters only when the scale is very thin.
3. Compositional changes in the alloy or scale. There are 3 cases:
  1. Selective oxidation depletes one alloy element at the surface, shifting the alloy's lattice spacing and producing stress.
  2. Niobium, tantalum, and zirconium have unusually high oxygen solubility, so oxygen dissolves into the metal as interstitial atoms and the lattice expands.
  3. Many engineering alloys contain pre-existing carbide precipitates such as Fe_{3}C in carbon steels or M_{23}C_{6}-type carbides in superalloys. When oxidation penetrates inward, these carbides oxidize too, producing local volume changes.
4. Some oxides have large deviations from stoichiometry. Wüstite for example is actually Fe_{0.95}O to Fe_{0.88}O at 1000 °C, with 5 to 12 percent of its iron sites vacant. The concentration of these cation vacancies varies across the scale thickness, and the corresponding variation in lattice spacing stresses the scale.
5. Recrystallization in the oxide scale has been proposed as a stress source, but Birks, Meier & Pettit (2006) note that it usually relieves growth stress rather than generates it. However, if the underlying alloy recrystalizes, it can increase stress. In fine-grained Fe-Cr alloys, grain growth disrupts the protective Cr_{2}O_{3} scale locally and lets Fe-rich oxide nodules form. Coarse-grained Fe-Cr keeps a continuous Cr_{2}O_{3} scale.
6. New oxide forming within the scale. If the oxidant migrates inward along oxide grain boundaries or microcracks, it can react to form new oxide at sites inside the existing scale, rather than only at the outer surface. This inserts new oxide into a region with no room for it, generating compressive stress.
7. Specimen geometry. Curvature and finite size produce additional stresses. Hancock & Hurst (1974) distinguish four cases by growth mode and surface convexity.

The PBR is well-known, though Young (2016) characterizes it as "conceptually useful but of little quantitative use". Many oxides grow predominantly by outward metal diffusion. The PBR model does not apply in that case. Even when it does apply, the predicted stress levels are unphysically high.

=== Thermal stresses ===
Stresses also develop on cooling, from the differential thermal contraction of metal and oxide. The magnitude is proportional to $\Delta\alpha = \alpha_M - \alpha_{\mathrm{Ox}}$. The stress is usually compressive in the oxide. It is rapidly induced enough that creep cannot relieve it. Temperature-cycled exposures are therefore more damaging than isothermal ones. A compressively stressed scale spalls when the elastic strain energy stored in it exceeds the fracture resistance of the oxide-metal interface.

=== Protective scale formers ===
Only three elements consistently form a slow-growing, adherent scale: chromium (Cr_{2}O_{3}), aluminum (Al_{2}O_{3}), and silicon (SiO_{2}). Alloys for high-temperature service are designed so one of these oxides forms preferentially at the surface.

=== Alloy composition thresholds ===
Heat-resistant stainless steels typically need more than 20 wt% chromium. The popular 18 wt% Cr / 8 wt% Ni stainless steels were developed for aqueous corrosion resistance. They are not oxidation-resistant at high temperatures.

Alumina-forming examples include Kanthal and MCrAlY coatings. For binary Ni-Al alloys, the minimum Al for an external Al_{2}O_{3} scale is debated. Estimates range from 5 to 17 wt%, depending on temperature and how strictly "protective" is defined. Even when a sustained alumina scale does form on binary Ni-Al, it spalls profusely on cooling.

The M-Cr-Al ternaries used in industry exploit a synergistic effect. About 10 wt% Cr enables an alumina scale on alloys with as little as 5 wt% Al. Inconel and similar nickel-based superalloys exploit this.

=== Healing ===
A protective scale can fail by spalling, cracking, or breakaway oxidation. The alloy must still contain enough scale-forming element to reform the layer. Once depletion penetrates significantly into the alloy, this regeneration is no longer feasible. Oxidation then accelerates rapidly.

== See also ==
- High-temperature corrosion
- Pilling-Bedworth ratio
- Mill scale
- Firescale
