= Internal oxidation =

Corrosion method found in metals

Internal oxidation, in corrosion of metals, is the process of formation of corrosion products (e.g. a metal oxide) within the metal bulk. In other words, the corrosion products are created away from the metal surface, and they are isolated from the surface.

Internal oxidation occurs when some components of the alloy are oxidized in preference to the balance of the bulk. The oxidizer is often oxygen diffusing through the metal bulk from the interface, but it can be also another element (for example sulfur or nitrogen).

Internal oxidation is a well-known corrosion mechanism of nickel-based alloys in the temperature range of 500 to 1200 °C.

Internal oxidation is distinct from selective leaching.
