= Cadmium tetrafluoroborate =

Names
- Other names Cadmium(II) tetrafluoroborate Cadmium fluoroborate Cadmium fluoborate

Identifiers
CAS Number	14486-19-2
3D model (JSmol)	Interactive image
ChemSpider	13621601
ECHA InfoCard	100.034.975
EC Number	238-490-5
PubChem CID	12886773
UNII	6FO2G6257B
CompTox Dashboard (EPA)	DTXSID50884756
- InChI: InChI=1S/2BF4.Cd/c2*2-1(3,4)5;/q2*-1;+2 Key: NXOFSPIMFJTFSE-UHFFFAOYSA-N
- SMILES: [B-](F)(F)(F)F.[B-](F)(F)(F)F.[Cd+2]

Properties
Chemical formula	Cd(BF_{4})_{2}
Molar mass	286.020 g/mol
Appearance	colorless solid crystals very hygroscopic
Odor	odorless
Density	1.60 g/cm^{3}
Solubility in water	very soluble
Solubility	very soluble in alcohol

Hazards
- NIOSH (US health exposure limits)
PEL (Permissible)	[1910.1027] TWA 0.005 mg/m^{3} (as Cd)
REL (Recommended)	Ca
IDLH (Immediate danger)	Ca [9 mg/m^{3} (as Cd)]
- Except where otherwise noted, data are given for materials in their standard state (at 25 °C [77 °F], 100 kPa). Infobox references

Cadmium tetrafluoroborate is an ionic, chemical compound with the formula Cd(BF_{4})_{2}. It is a crystalline solid, which is colorless and odorless. Cadmium tetrafluoroborate is most frequently used in the industrial production of high-strength steels, its purpose being to prevent hydrogen absorption, a source of post-production cracking of the metal, in the treated steels. Another application of the chemistry of cadmium tetrafluoroborate is fine tuning of the size of cadmium telluride nanomaterials.

While the use of cadmium tetrafluoroborate is limited, concerns about limited or chronic exposure to this substance should be brought to the attention of a physician or other trained medical staff. Exposure to cadmium tetrafluoroborate, via ingestion, contact with the skin or mucous membranes, or inhalation can have lasting and harmful health effects.

== Preparation ==
Cadmium tetrafluoroborate may be prepared from the reaction between an aqueous solution of fluoroboric acid and cadmium carbonate or cadmium oxide:

2 H_{3}OBF_{4}(aq) + CdCO_{3}(s) → Cd(BF_{4})_{2}(aq) + CO_{2}(g) + 2 H_{2}O(l)
2 H_{3}OBF_{4}(aq) + CdO(s) → Cd(BF_{4})_{2}(aq) + 3 H_{2}O(l)

It is also possible to prepare cadmium tetrafluoroborate through an oxidation-reduction reaction implementing nitrosyl tetrafluoroborate:

Cd(s) + 2 NOBF_{4} Cd(BF_{4})_{2} + 2 NO

== Structure ==
=== Cadmium tetrafluoroborate ===
Cadmium tetrafluoroborate is an ionic compound formed from the two, ionic species Cd^{2+} and BF_{4}^{−}. At room temperature it forms colorless, odorless crystals which are soluble in polar solvents such as water or ethanol. At room temperature, the hydrated salt, Cd(BF_{4})_{2}·6H_{2}O, exists in a monoclinic crystal system, though this is temperature dependent. Two, first-order phase transitions have been noted in the literature for this material, one each at 324 and 177 K (51 and −96 °C), representing a change in the crystal system from monoclinic to trigonal and from trigonal to either monoclinic or triclinic, respectively. The quasi-trigonal geometry of the cadmium tetrafluoroborate hexahydrate crystal is unique among the first-row transition metal tetrafluoroborates and perchlorates, which have predominately hexagonal structures.

=== Related transition-metal complexes ===
The Cd^{2+} species of cadmium tetrafluoroborate may associate with various ligands to form transition-metal complexes. The structural formulas and geometries for such complexes can vary depending upon coordination number of the complex and the electronic properties of the ligands (see also, HSAB theory). However, two general forms may predominate: (i) [Cd(L)_{n}(BF_{4})_{m}], where L and BF_{4}^{−} are ligands in the inner-sphere, and (ii) [Cd(L)_{n}](BF_{4})_{2}, where BF_{4}^{−} is located in the outer-sphere; for both, n=1,2,…,6. The literature contains reports of distorted octahedral geometries for Cadmium tetrafluoroborate complexes with nitrogen-containing ligands such as pyrazoles and imidazoles and porphyrins. Given the structural formulas for Cadmium tetrafluoroborate complexes noted in the literature however, such as [Cd(L)_{4}(BF_{4})_{2}], it is likely that tetrahedral geometries are also possible in such complexes.

== Uses ==
=== Electroplating ===
The most significant, industrial use of Cd(BF_{4})_{2} is in the electroplating of high-strength steels. Here, species such as cadmium tetrafluoroborate (or Cd-Ti or CdCN) are deposited on the surface of steels in an electroplating process which inhibits absorption of hydrogen onto the surface of the steels, a source of cracking following baking of the metal. Optimization of the electroplating process, adjusting electrolyte concentrations in Cadmium tetrafluoroborate mixes, has been explored in the literature. Among other methods of electroplating, cadmium tetrafluoroborate baths have middling efficiency. It has, for instance, been demonstrated that traditional cyanide bathes (e.g. CdCN or ZnCN) and variants there-of provide more efficient distribution of current density during electroplating, resulting in steels which could bear greater loads.

=== Nanomaterials ===
A method of etching of CdTe nanocrystals which removes Cd from the surface of the nano-structures via attack by tetrafluoroborate anions has been reported in the literature. While the presence of Cd-F surface bonds and dissociation of Cd from the surface of the nano-structures are clear from the investigation, complex formation of Cd with BF_{4}^{−} in solution was not discussed though may be inferred from the spectrophotometric results.

=== Determination of boron in steels by solvent extraction ===
Methodology has been reported for the determination of boron concentration in steels using cadmium tetrafluoroborate complex formation during solvent extraction to facilitate indirect atomic absorption measurements. Tetrafluoroborate, formed from acid extraction of boron for a steel sample using boric acid, associates with a transition metal complex of Cd^{2+} and forms a complex which is measureable by atomic absorption spectroscopy. Similar procedures have been implemented for the same purpose using other transition metals and for determination of boron in high-purity silicon using other cadmium tetrafluoroborate transition metal complexes.

== Hazards and Safety ==
=== Biological hazards, safety, and treatment ===
Cadmium tetreafluoroborate is a caustic substance, particularly when in aqueous solution. Multiple routes of exposure, such as ingestion, inhalation, or contact with the skin or mucous membranes, are available through contact with aqueous cadmium tetrafluorobromate. Target biological systems following exposure include the lungs, kidneys, and liver. Symptoms of cadmium tetrafluoroborate exposure include nausea, vomiting, fever, irritation of the mucous membranes (e.g. upper respiratory tract, eyes) and skin, coughing, wheezing, or difficulty breathing. The mechanism of toxicity of this substance is related to cadmium poisoning and exposure to borates and hydrofluoric acid. The compound functions in solution as a weakly acidic inorganic salt, neutralizing bases. After initial exposure, thorough rising of the affected area with water is recommended. However, seeking medical attention is strongly advised as treatment for exposure to Cd or F containing compounds such as cadmium tetrafluoroborate generally involves intravenous administration (I.V.) of calcium chloride and sodium bicarbonate for the purpose of maintaining blood pH and sequestering Cd^{2+} and BF_{4}^{−} in insoluble salts.

=== Chronic exposure ===
Chronic exposure to this substance may have negative health consequences. According to its OSHA, IARC, and ACGIH ratings, cadmium tetrafluoroborate is recognized as a carcinogenic substance. Further effects of chronic exposure may include hypocalcaemia and edemas of the respiratory system.

=== Non-biological hazards and safety ===
Although this compound is a negligible fire hazard, combustion of cadmium tetrafluoroborate produces hazardous decomposition products including cadmium/cadmium oxide and hydrogen fluoride. Therefore, cadmium tetrafluoroborate is stored out of direct light, in a cool environment, and away from other flammable materials.

== See also ==
- Hydrogen embrittlement
- Electroplating
- HSAB theory
