= Pilling–Bedworth ratio =

Concept relating to the corrosion of metals

In corrosion of metals, the Pilling–Bedworth ratio (P–B ratio) is the ratio of the volume of the elementary cell of a metal oxide to the volume of the elementary cell of the corresponding metal (from which the oxide is created).

On the basis of the P–B ratio, it can be judged whether the metal is likely to passivate in dry air by creation of a protective oxide layer.

== Definition ==
The P–B ratio is defined as

$$R_{PB} =\frac{V_\text{oxide}}{n \cdot V_\text{metal}} = \frac{ M_\text{oxide} \cdot \rho_\text{metal}} {n \cdot M_\text{metal} \cdot \rho_\text{oxide}},$$

where

- $M$ is the atomic or molecular mass,
- $n$ is the number of atoms of metal per molecule of the oxide,
- $\rho$ is the density,
- $V$ is the molar volume.

== History ==
N.B. Pilling and R.E. Bedworth suggested in 1923 that metals can be classed into two categories: those that form protective oxides, and those that cannot. They ascribed the protectiveness of the oxide to the volume the oxide takes in comparison to the volume of the metal used to produce this oxide in a corrosion process in dry air. The oxide layer would be unprotective if the ratio is less than unity because the film that forms on the metal surface is porous and/or cracked. Conversely, the metals with the ratio higher than 1 tend to be protective because they form an effective barrier that prevents the gas from further oxidizing the metal.

== Application ==
Scheme of the oxide structure and the Pilling–Bedworth ratio.

On the basis of measurements, the following connection can be shown:

- R_{PB} < 1: the oxide coating layer is too thin, likely broken and provides no protective effect (for example magnesium)
- R_{PB} > 2: the oxide coating chips off and provides no protective effect (example iron)
- 1 < R_{PB} < 2: the oxide coating is passivating and provides a protecting effect against further surface oxidation (examples aluminium, titanium, chromium-containing steels).

However, the exceptions to the above P–B ratio rules are numerous. Many of the exceptions can be attributed to the mechanism of the oxide growth: the underlying assumption in the P–B ratio is that oxygen needs to diffuse through the oxide layer to the metal surface; in reality, it is often the metal ion that diffuses to the air-oxide interface.

The P–B ratio is important when modelling the oxidation of nuclear fuel cladding tubes, which are typically made of Zirconium alloys, as it defines how much of the cladding that is consumed and weakened due to oxidation. The P–B ratio of Zirconium alloys can vary between 1.48 and 1.56, meaning that the oxide is more voluminous than the consumed metal.

== Values ==
Metal	Metal oxide	Formula	R_{PB}
Potassium	Potassium oxide	K_{2}O	0.474
Sodium	Sodium oxide	Na_{2}O	0.541
Lithium	Lithium oxide	Li_{2}O	0.567
Strontium	Strontium oxide	SrO	0.611
Calcium	Calcium oxide	CaO	0.64
Barium	Barium oxide	BaO	0.67
Magnesium	Magnesium oxide	MgO	0.81
Aluminium	Aluminium oxide	Al_{2}O_{3}	1.28
Lead	Lead(II) oxide	PbO	1.28
Platinum	Platinum(II) oxide	PtO	1.56
Zirconium	Zirconium(IV) oxide	ZrO_{2}	1.56
Zinc	Zinc oxide	ZnO	1.58
Hafnium	Hafnium(IV) oxide	HfO_{2}	1.62
Nickel	Nickel(II) oxide	NiO	1.65
Copper	Copper(II) oxide	CuO	1.68
Iron	Iron(II) oxide	FeO	1.7
Titanium	Titanium(IV) oxide	TiO_{2}	1.73
Iron	Iron(II,III) oxide	Fe_{3}O_{4}	1.90
Chromium	Chromium(III) oxide	Cr_{2}O_{3}	2.07
Iron	Iron(III) oxide	Fe_{2}O_{3}	2.14
Silicon	Silicon dioxide	SiO_{2}	2.15
Tantalum	Tantalum(V) oxide	Ta_{2}O_{5}	2.47
Niobium	Niobium pentoxide	Nb_{2}O_{5}	2.69
Vanadium	Vanadium(V) oxide	V_{2}O_{5}	3.25
Tungsten	Tungsten(VI) oxide	WO_{3}	3.3
