= Mill scale =

Chemical compound produced in steel processing

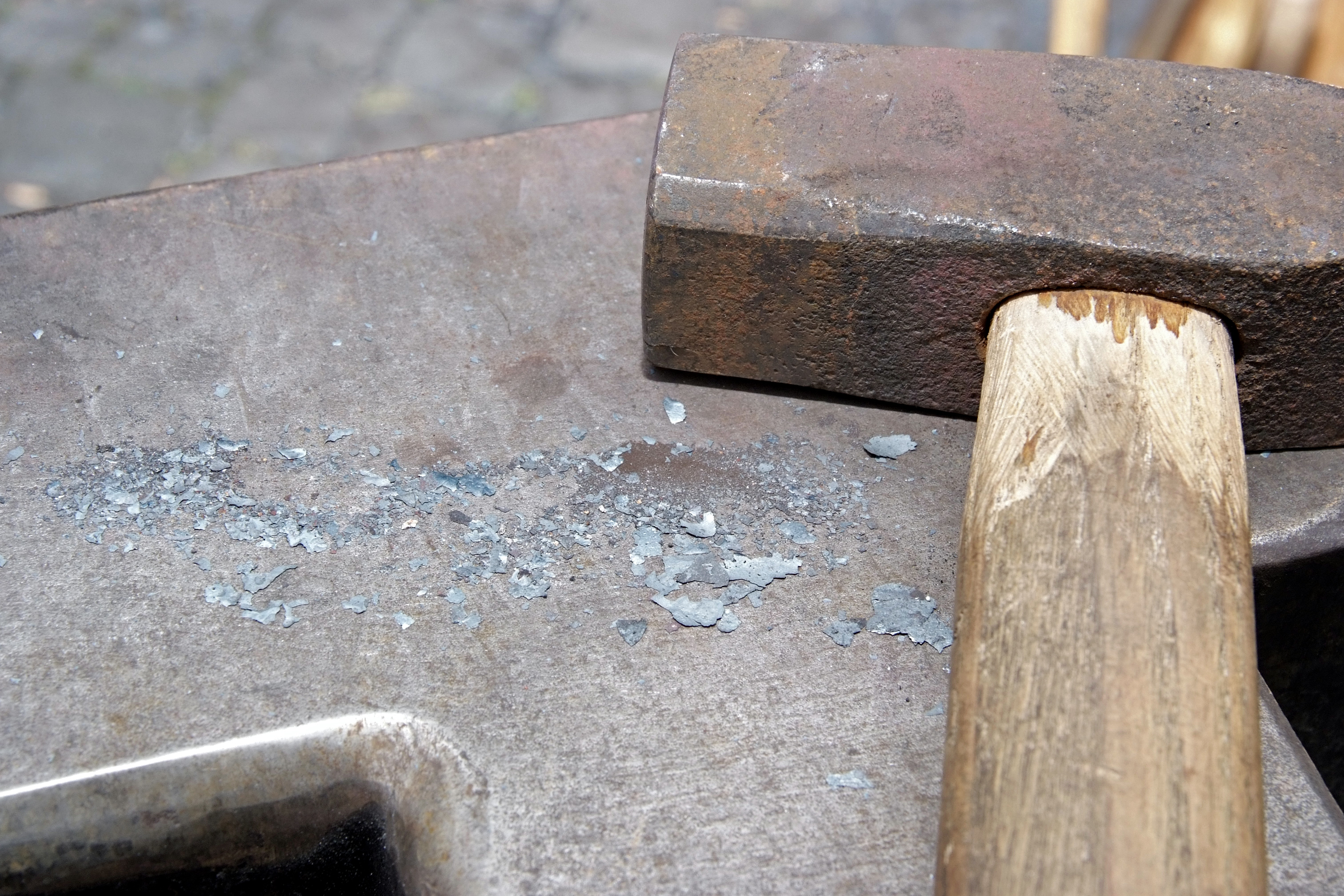
Mill scale on an anvil

Mill scale, often shortened to just scale, is the flaky surface of hot rolled steel, consisting of the mixed iron oxides iron(II) oxide (FeO, wüstite), iron(III) oxide (Fe_{2}O_{3}, hematite), and iron(II,III) oxide (Fe_{3}O_{4}, magnetite).

Mill scale is formed on the outer surfaces of plates, sheets or profiles when they are produced by passing red hot iron or steel billets through rolling mills. Mill scale is bluish-black in color. It is usually less than 1 mm (0.039 in) thick, and initially adheres to the steel surface and protects it from atmospheric corrosion provided no break occurs in this coating.

Because it is electrochemically cathodic to steel, any break in the mill scale coating will cause accelerated corrosion of steel exposed at the break. Mill scale is thus a boon for a while, until its coating breaks due to handling of the steel product or due to any other mechanical cause.

Mill scale becomes a nuisance when the steel is to be processed. Any paint applied over it is wasted, since it will come off with the scale as moisture-laden air gets under it. Thus mill scale needs to be removed from steel surfaces by flame cleaning, pickling, or abrasive blasting, which are all tedious operations that consume energy. This is why shipbuilders and steel fixers used to leave steel and rebar delivered freshly rolled from mills out in the open to allow it to 'weather' until most of the scale fell off due to atmospheric action. Nowadays, most steel mills can supply their product with mill scale removed and steel coated with shop primers over which welding or painting can be done safely.

Mill scale generated in rolling mills will be collected and sent to a sinter plant for recycling.

== In art ==
Mill scale is sought after by abstract expressionist artists for its unpredicted and seemingly random organic visual effects. Although the majority of mill scale is removed from steel during its passage through scale breaker rolls during manufacturing, smaller structurally inconsequential residue can be visible. Leveraging this processing vestige by accelerating its corrosive effects through the metallurgical use of phosphoric acid or in conjunction with selenium dioxide can create a high contrast visual substrate onto which other compositional elements can be added.

== In refractory production ==
Mill scale can be used as a raw material in granular refractory. When this refractory is cast and preheated, these scales provide escape routes for the evaporating water vapor, thus preventing cracks and resulting in a strong, monolithic structure.

== In reduced iron powder production ==
Mill scale is a complex oxide that contains around 70% iron with traces of nonferrous metals and alkaline compounds. Reduced iron powder may be obtained by conversion of mill scale into a single highest oxide i.e. hematite (Fe_{2}O_{3}) followed by reduction with hydrogen. Shahid and Choi reported the reverse co-precipitation method for the synthesis of magnetite (Fe_{3}O_{4}) from mill scale and used for multiple environmental applications such as nutrient recovery, ballasted coagulation in activated sludge process, and heavy metal remediation in an aqueous environment.

== See also ==
- Dross – Impurities in molten metal
- Scaling (metallurgy) – Growth of an oxide layer on a metal at high temperature
- Firescale – Oxidation on copper alloys
- Hammer paint – Lacquer that looks like hammered metal when dried
- Slag – By-product of smelting ores and used metals
- Slag (welding) – Vitreous material produced as a byproduct of some arc welding processes
