= Deal–Grove model =

Mathematical model of semiconductor oxidation

The Deal–Grove model mathematically describes the growth of an oxide layer on the surface of a material. In particular, it is used to predict and interpret thermal oxidation of silicon in semiconductor device fabrication. The model was first published in 1965 by Bruce Deal and Andrew Grove of Fairchild Semiconductor, building on Mohamed M. Atalla's work on silicon surface passivation by thermal oxidation at Bell Labs in the late 1950s. This served as a step in the development of CMOS devices and the fabrication of integrated circuits.

== Physical assumptions ==
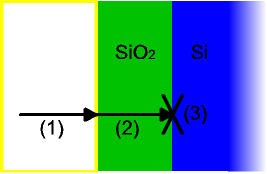
The three phenomena of oxidation, as described in the article text

The model assumes that the oxidation reaction occurs at the interface between the oxide layer and the substrate material, rather than between the oxide and the ambient gas. Thus, it considers three phenomena that the oxidizing species undergoes, in this order:

1. It diffuses from the bulk of the ambient gas to the surface.
2. It diffuses through the existing oxide layer to the oxide-substrate interface.
3. It reacts with the substrate.

The model assumes that each of these stages proceeds at a rate proportional to the oxidant's concentration. In the first step, this means Henry's law; in the second, Fick's law of diffusion; in the third, a first-order reaction with respect to the oxidant. It also assumes steady state conditions, i.e. that transient effects do not appear.

== Results ==
Given these assumptions, the flux of oxidant through each of the three phases can be expressed in terms of concentrations, material properties, and temperature.

$$\begin{align}
J_\text{gas} & = h_g (C_g- C_s) \\[8pt]
J_\text{oxide} & = D_\text{ox} \frac{C_s- C_i}{x} \\[8pt]
J_\text{reacting} & = k_i C_i
\end{align}$$

where: $h_g$ is the gas-phase transport coefficient, $C_g$ is the concentration of oxidant in the surrounding atmosphere, $C_s$ is the concentration of oxidant in the surface of the oxide, $C_i$ is the concentration of the oxidant at the interface between the oxide and the substrate, $D_{ox}$ is the diffusion coeffiecient through the oxide, $x$ is the thickness of the oxide, and $k_i$ is the reaction rate coefficient for oxidation at the surface of the substrate.

At steady state, we assume the three fluxes are equal to each other $J_\text{gas} = J_\text{oxide} = J_\text{reacting},$ the following relations can be derived:

$$\begin{align}
\frac {C_i}{C_g} & = \frac {1}{1+k_i/h_g+k_ix/D_\text{ox}} \\[8pt]
\frac {C_s}{C_g} & = \frac {1+k_ix/D_\text{ox}}{1+k_i/h_g+k_ix/D_\text{ox}}
\end{align}$$

Assuming a diffusion controlled growth i.e. where $J_\text{oxide}$ determines the growth rate, and substituting $C_i$ and $C_s$ in terms of $C_g$ from the above two relations into $J_\text{oxide}$ and $J_\text{reacting}$ equation respectively, one obtains:

$$J_\text{oxide} = J_\text{reacting} = \frac {k_iC_g}{1+k_i/h_g+k_ix/D_\text{ox}}$$

If N is the concentration of the oxidant inside a unit volume of the oxide, then the oxide growth rate can be written in the form of a differential equation. The solution to this equation gives the oxide thickness at any time t.

$$\begin{align}
& \frac{dx}{dt} = \frac{J_\text{oxide}}{N} = \frac {k_iC_g/N}{1+k_i/h_g+k_ix/D_\text{ox}} \\[8pt]
& x^2 + Ax = Bt + {x_i}^2 + Ax_i \\[8pt]
& x^2 + Ax = B(t+\tau)
\end{align}$$

where the constants $A$ and $B$ encapsulate the properties of the reaction and the oxide layer respectively, and $x_i$ is the initial layer of oxide that was present at the surface. These constants are given as:

$$\begin{align}
A=2 D_\text{ox} \left(\frac{1}{k_i} + \frac{1}{h_g} \right) \\[8pt]
B= \frac {2D_\text{ox} C_g}{N} \\[8pt]
\tau = \frac{x_i^2 + A x_i}{B}
\end{align}$$

where $C_g = H P_g$, with $H$ being the gas solubility parameter of the Henry's law and $P_g$ is the partial pressure of the diffusing gas.

Solving the quadratic equation for x yields:

$$x(t) = \frac{-A+\sqrt{A^2+4(B)(t+\tau)}}{2}$$

Taking the short and long time limits of the above equation reveals two main modes of operation. The first mode, where the growth is linear, occurs initially when $t+\tau$ is small. The second mode gives a quadratic growth and occurs when the oxide thickens as the oxidation time increases.

$$\begin{align}
t+\tau \ll \frac{A^2}{4B} \Rightarrow x(t) = \frac{B}{A}(t+\tau) \\[8pt]
t+\tau \gg \frac{A^2}{4B} \Rightarrow x(t) = \sqrt{B(t+\tau)}
\end{align}$$

The quantities B and B/A are often called the quadratic and linear reaction rate constants. They depend exponentially on temperature, like this:

$$B = B_0 e^{-E_A/kT}; \quad B/A = (B/A)_0 e^{-E_A/kT}$$

where $E_A$ is the activation energy and $k$ is the Boltzmann constant in eV. $E_A$ differs from one equation to the other. The following table lists the values of the four parameters for single-crystal silicon under conditions typically used in industry (low doping, atmospheric pressure). The linear rate constant depends on the orientation of the crystal (usually indicated by the Miller indices of the crystal plane facing the surface). The table gives values for $\langle 100\rangle$ and $\langle 111\rangle$ silicon.

Parameter	Quantity	Wet ($H_2O$)	Dry ($O_2$)
Linear rate constant	$(B/A)_0\ \left(\frac{\mu m}{hr}\right)$	$\langle 100\rangle$: 9.7 ×10^{7} $\langle 111\rangle$: 1.63 ×10^{8}	$\langle 100\rangle$: 3.71 ×10^{6} $\langle 111\rangle$: 6.23 ×10^{6}
Linear rate constant	$E_A$ (eV)	2.05	2.00
Parabolic rate constant	$B_0\ \left(\frac{(\mu m)^2}{hr}\right)$	386	772
Parabolic rate constant	$E_A$ (eV)	0.78	1.23

== Validity for silicon ==
The Deal–Grove model works very well for single-crystal silicon under most conditions. However, experimental data shows that very thin oxides (less than about 25 nanometres) grow much more quickly in $O_2$ than the model predicts. In silicon nanostructures (e.g., silicon nanowires) this rapid growth is generally followed by diminishing oxidation kinetics in a process known as self-limiting oxidation, necessitating a modification of the Deal–Grove model.

If the oxide grown in a particular oxidation step greatly exceeds 25 nm, a simple adjustment accounts for the aberrant growth rate. The model yields accurate results for thick oxides if, instead of assuming zero initial thickness (or any initial thickness less than 25 nm), we assume that 25 nm of oxide exists before oxidation begins. However, for oxides near to or thinner than this threshold, more sophisticated models must be used.

In the 1980s, it became obvious that an update to the Deal-Grove model is necessary to model the aforementioned thin oxides (self-limiting cases). One such approach that more accurately models thin oxides is the Massoud model from 1985. The Massoud model is analytical and based on parallel oxidation mechanisms. It changes the parameters of the Deal-Grove model to better model the initial oxide growth with the addition of rate-enhancement terms.

The Deal-Grove model also fails for polycrystalline silicon ("poly-silicon"). First, the random orientation of the crystal grains makes it difficult to choose a value for the linear rate constant. Second, oxidant molecules diffuse rapidly along grain boundaries, so that poly-silicon oxidizes more rapidly than single-crystal silicon.

Dopant atoms strain the silicon lattice, and make it easier for silicon atoms to bond with incoming oxygen. This effect may be neglected in many cases, but heavily doped silicon oxidizes significantly faster. The pressure of the ambient gas also affects oxidation rate.

== Bibliography ==
- Massoud, H. Z.; J.D. Plummer (1985). "Thermal oxidation of silicon in dry oxygen: Accurate determination of the kinetic rate constants". Journal of the Electrochemical Society. 132 (11): 2693–2700. doi:10.1149/1.2113649.
- Jaeger, Richard C. (2002). "Thermal Oxidation of Silicon". Introduction to Microelectronic Fabrication (2nd ed.). Upper Saddle River: Prentice Hall. ISBN 0-201-44494-1.
- Deal, B. E.; A. S. Grove (December 1965). "General Relationship for the Thermal Oxidation of Silicon". Journal of Applied Physics. 36 (12): 3770–3778. Bibcode:1965JAP....36.3770D. doi:10.1063/1.1713945.
