= Passivation (chemistry) =

Physico-chemical processes contributing to protect a surface against oxidation

Passivation, in physical chemistry and engineering, refers to coating a material so it becomes "passive", that is, less readily affected or corroded by the environment. Passivation involves creation of an outer layer of shield material that is applied as a microcoating, created by chemical reaction with the base material, or allowed to build by spontaneous oxidation in the air. As a technique, passivation is the use of a light coat of a protective material, such as metal oxide, to create a shield against corrosion. Passivation of silicon is used during fabrication of microelectronic devices. In electrochemical treatment of water, passivation reduces the effectiveness of the treatment by increasing the circuit resistance, and active measures are typically used to overcome this effect, the most common being polarity reversal, which results in limited rejection of the fouling layer.

When exposed to air, many metals naturally form a hard, relatively inert surface layer, usually an oxide (termed the "native oxide layer") or a nitride, that serves as a passivation layer. In the case of silver, the dark tarnish is a passivation layer of silver sulfide formed from reaction with environmental hydrogen sulfide. (In contrast, metals such as iron oxidize readily to form a rough porous coating of rust that adheres loosely and sloughs off readily, allowing further oxidation.) The passivation layer of oxide markedly slows further oxidation and corrosion in room-temperature air for aluminium, beryllium, chromium, zinc, titanium, and silicon (a metalloid). The inert surface layer formed by reaction with air has a thickness of about 1.5 nm for silicon, 1–10 nm for beryllium, and 1 nm initially for titanium, growing to 25 nm after several years. Similarly, for aluminium, it grows to about 5 nm after several years.

In the context of the semiconductor device fabrication, such as silicon MOSFET transistors and solar cells, surface passivation refers not only to reducing the chemical reactivity of the surface but also to eliminating the dangling bonds and other defects that form electronic surface states, which impair performance of the devices. Surface passivation of silicon usually consists of high-temperature thermal oxidation.

== Mechanisms ==
Pourbaix diagram of iron.

There has been much interest in determining the mechanisms that govern the increase of thickness of the oxide layer over time. Some of the important factors are the volume of oxide relative to the volume of the parent metal, the mechanism of oxygen diffusion through the metal oxide to the parent metal, and the relative chemical potential of the oxide. Boundaries between micro grains, if the oxide layer is crystalline, form an important pathway for oxygen to reach the unoxidized metal below. For this reason, vitreous oxide coatings – which lack grain boundaries – can retard oxidation. The conditions necessary, but not sufficient, for passivation are recorded in Pourbaix diagrams. Some corrosion inhibitors help the formation of a passivation layer on the surface of the metals to which they are applied. Some compounds, dissolved in solutions (chromates, molybdates) form non-reactive and low solubility films on metal surfaces.

== History ==
In the mid 1800s, Christian Friedrich Schönbein discovered that when a piece of iron is placed in dilute nitric acid, it will dissolve and produce hydrogen, but if the iron is placed in concentrated nitric acid and then returned to the dilute nitric acid, little or no reaction will take place. Schönbein named the first state the active condition and the second the passive condition. If passive iron is touched by active iron, it becomes active again. In 1920, Ralph S. Lillie measured the effect of an active piece of iron touching a passive iron wire and found that "a wave of activation sweeps rapidly (at some hundred centimeters a second) over its whole length".

== Specific materials ==
=== Aluminium ===
Aluminium naturally forms a thin surface layer of aluminium oxide on contact with oxygen in the atmosphere through a process called oxidation, which creates a physical barrier to corrosion or further oxidation in many environments. Some aluminium alloys, however, do not form the oxide layer well, and thus are not protected against corrosion. There are methods to enhance the formation of the oxide layer for certain alloys. For example, prior to storing hydrogen peroxide in an aluminium container, the container can be passivated by rinsing it with a dilute solution of nitric acid and peroxide alternating with deionized water. The nitric acid and peroxide mixture oxidizes and dissolves any impurities on the inner surface of the container, and the deionized water rinses away the acid and oxidized impurities.

Generally, there are two main ways to passivate aluminium alloys (not counting plating, painting, and other barrier coatings): chromate conversion coating and anodizing. Alclading, which metallurgically bonds thin layers of pure aluminium or alloy to different base aluminium alloy, is not strictly passivation of the base alloy. However, the aluminium layer clad on is designed to spontaneously develop the oxide layer and thus protect the base alloy.

Chromate conversion coating converts the surface aluminium to an aluminium chromate coating in the range of 0.00001–0.00004 inches (250–1,000 nm) in thickness. Aluminium chromate conversion coatings are amorphous in structure with a gel-like composition hydrated with water. Chromate conversion is a common way of passivating not only aluminium, but also zinc, cadmium, copper, silver, magnesium, and tin alloys.

Anodizing is an electrolytic process that forms a thicker oxide layer. The anodic coating consists of hydrated aluminium oxide and is considered resistant to corrosion and abrasion. This finish is more robust than the other processes and also provides electrical insulation, which the other two processes may not.

=== Iron ===
Because of its widespread use, iron has attracted much attention. Rust is an example of a non-adherent oxide coating that is not passivating.

==== Other ferrous materials ====
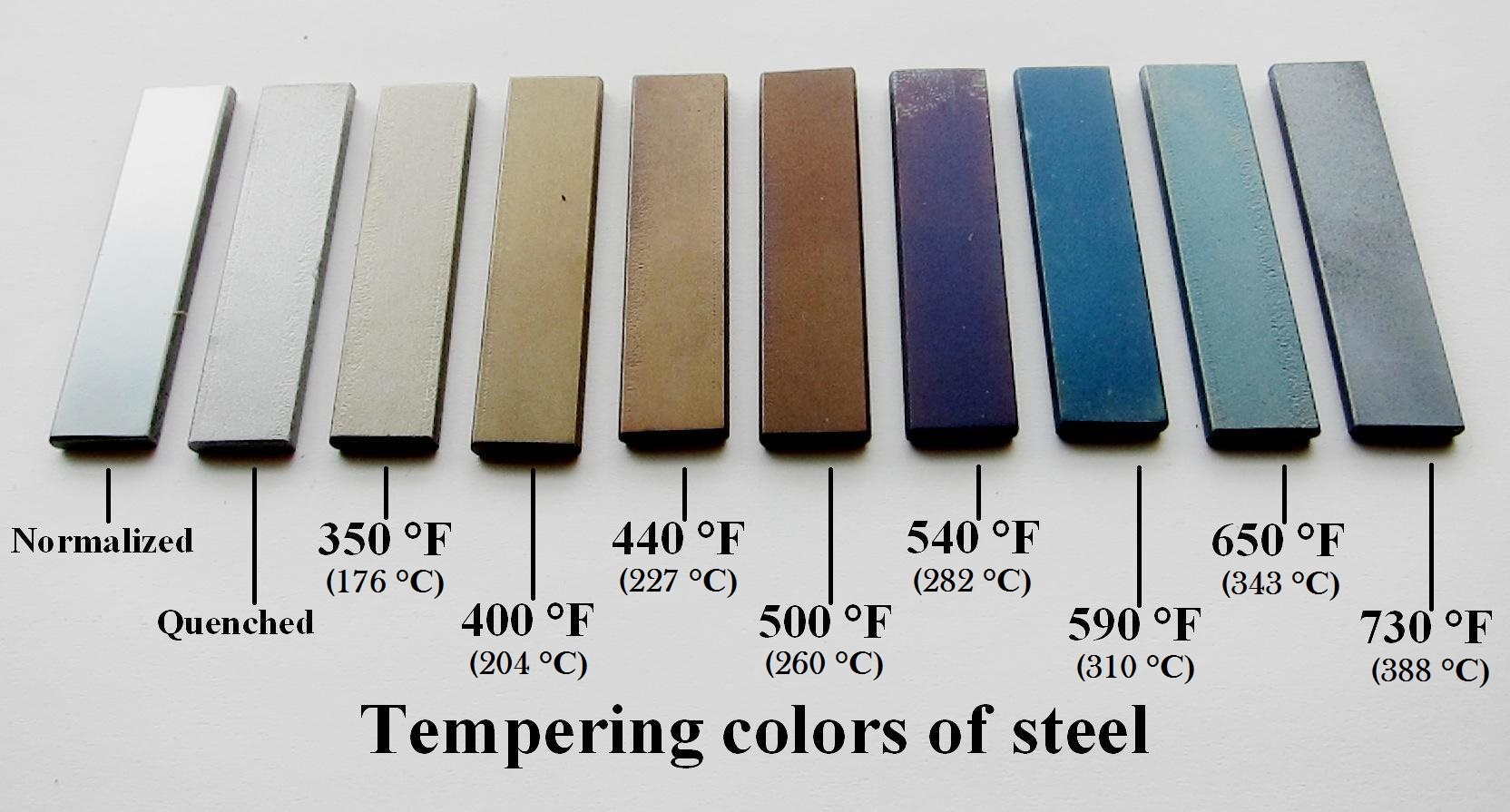
Tempering colors are produced when steel is heated and a thin film of iron oxide forms on the surface. The color indicates the temperature the steel reached, which made this one of the earliest practical uses of thin-film interference.

Ferrous materials, including steel, may be somewhat protected by promoting oxidation ("rust") and then converting the oxidation to a metalophosphate by using phosphoric acid and add further protection by surface coating. As the uncoated surface is water-soluble, a preferred method is to form manganese or zinc compounds by a process commonly known as parkerizing or phosphate conversion. Older, less-effective but chemically-similar electrochemical conversion coatings included black oxidizing, historically known as bluing or browning. Ordinary steel forms a passivating layer in alkali environments, as reinforcing bar does in concrete.

==== Stainless steel ====
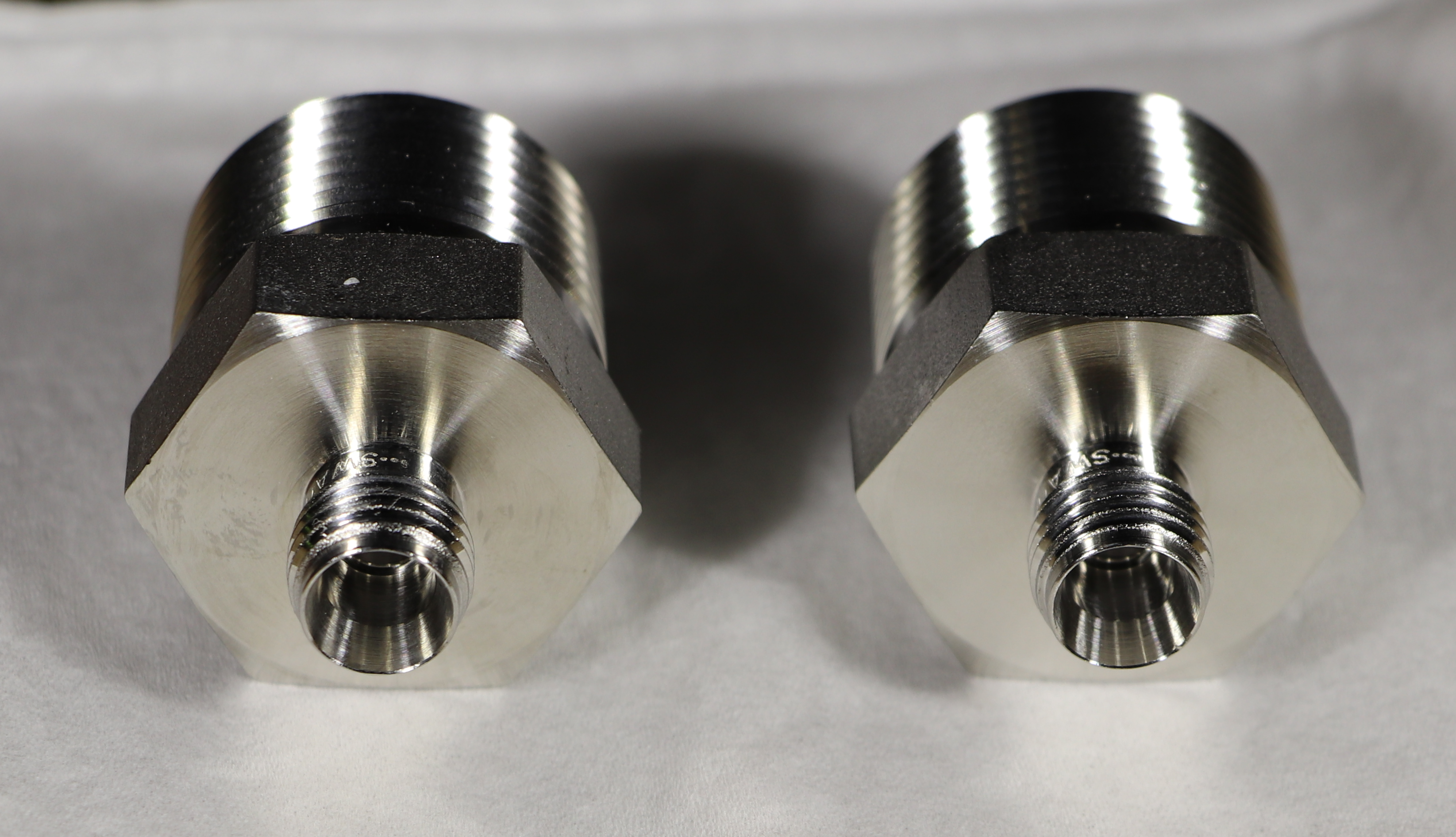
The fitting on the left has not been passivated, the fitting on the right has been passivated.

Stainless steels are corrosion-resistant, but they are not completely impervious to rusting. One common mode of corrosion in corrosion-resistant steels is when small spots on the surface begin to rust because grain boundaries or embedded bits of foreign matter (such as grinding swarf) allow water molecules to oxidize some of the iron in those spots despite the alloying chromium. This is called rouging. Some grades of stainless steel are especially resistant to rouging; parts made from them may therefore forgo any passivation step, depending on engineering decisions.

Common among all of the different specifications and types are the following steps: Prior to passivation, the object must be cleaned of any contaminants and generally must undergo a validating test to prove that the surface is 'clean.' The object is then placed in an acidic passivating bath that meets the temperature and chemical requirements of the method and type specified between customer and vendor. While nitric acid is commonly used as a passivating acid for stainless steel, citric acid is gaining in popularity as it is far less dangerous to handle, less toxic, and biodegradable, making disposal less of a challenge. Passivating temperatures can range from ambient to 60 degrees C, or 140 degrees F, while minimum passivation times are usually 20 to 30 minutes. After passivation, the parts are neutralized using a bath of aqueous sodium hydroxide, then rinsed with clean water and dried. The passive surface is validated using humidity, elevated temperature, a rusting agent (salt spray), or some combination of the three. The passivation process removes exogenous iron, creates/restores a passive oxide layer that prevents further oxidation (rust), and cleans the parts of dirt, scale, or other welding-generated compounds (e.g. oxides).

Passivation processes are generally controlled by industry standards, the most prevalent among them today being ASTM A 967 and AMS 2700. These industry standards generally list several passivation processes that can be used, with the choice of specific method left to the customer and vendor. The "method" is either a nitric acid-based passivating bath, or a citric acid-based bath, these acids remove surface iron and rust, while sparing the chromium. The various 'types' listed under each method refer to differences in acid bath temperature and concentration. Sodium dichromate is often required as an additive to oxidise the chromium in certain 'types' of nitric-based acid baths, however this chemical is highly toxic. With citric acid, simply rinsing and drying the part and allowing the air to oxidise it, or in some cases the application of other chemicals, is used to perform the passivation of the surface.

It is not uncommon for some aerospace manufacturers to have additional guidelines and regulations when passivating their products that exceed the national standard. Often, these requirements will be cascaded down using Nadcap or some other accreditation system. Various testing methods are available to determine the passivation (or passive state) of stainless steel. The most common methods for validating the passivity of a part is some combination of high humidity and heat for a period of time, intended to induce rusting. Electro-chemical testers can also be utilized to commercially verify passivation.

=== Titanium ===
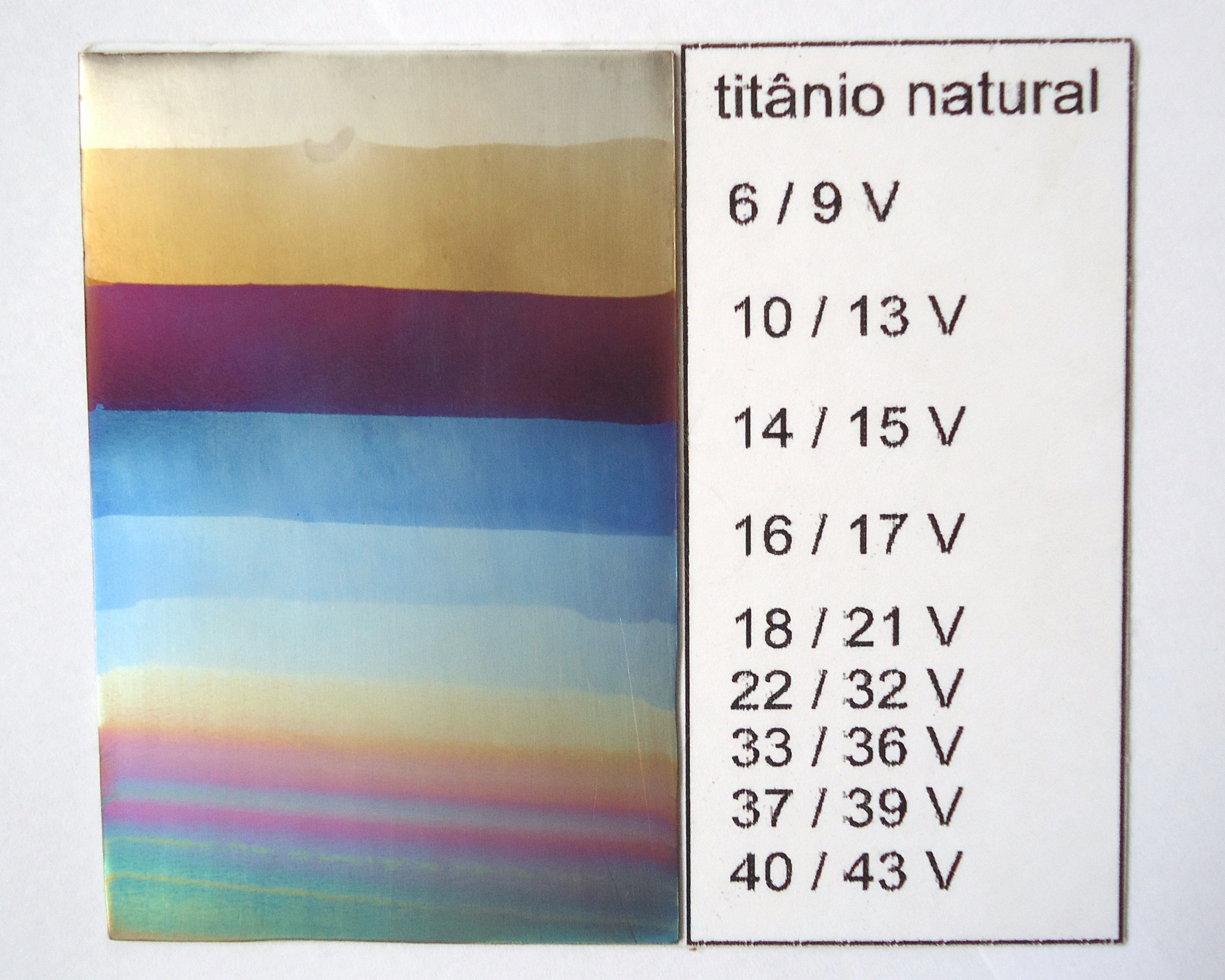
Relation between voltage and color for anodized titanium.

The surface of titanium and of titanium-rich alloys oxidizes immediately upon exposure to air to form a thin passivation layer of titanium oxide, mostly titanium dioxide. This layer makes it resistant to further corrosion, aside from gradual growth of the oxide layer, thickening to ~25 nm after several years in air. This protective layer makes it suitable for use even in corrosive environments such as sea water. Titanium can be anodized to produce a thicker passivation layer. As with many other metals, this layer causes thin-film interference which makes the metal surface appear colored, with the thickness of the passivation layer directly effecting the color produced.

=== Nickel ===
Nickel can be used for handling elemental fluorine, owing to the formation of a passivation layer of nickel fluoride. This fact is useful in water treatment and sewage treatment applications.

=== Silicon ===
In the area of microelectronics and photovoltaic solar cells, surface passivation is usually implemented by thermal oxidation at about 1000 °C to form a coating of silicon dioxide. Surface passivation is critical to solar cell efficiency. The effect of passivation on the efficiency of ranges from 3-7%. The surface resistivity is high, >100 Ωcm.

== Other materials ==
Passivation almost always refers to coatings on metals, usually oxides. Passivation can however be applied to a broad class of materials beyond metals.

The metal-organic compounds called perovskite solar cells can be protected using passivating coatings that also improves the photoelectric conversion efficiency.

In carbon quantum dot (CQD) technology, passivation has also been explored.

== See also ==
- Cold welding
- Deal-Grove model
- Pilling–Bedworth ratio
