= Nikolay Slavyanov =

Russian inventor (1854–1897)

- Николай Славянов
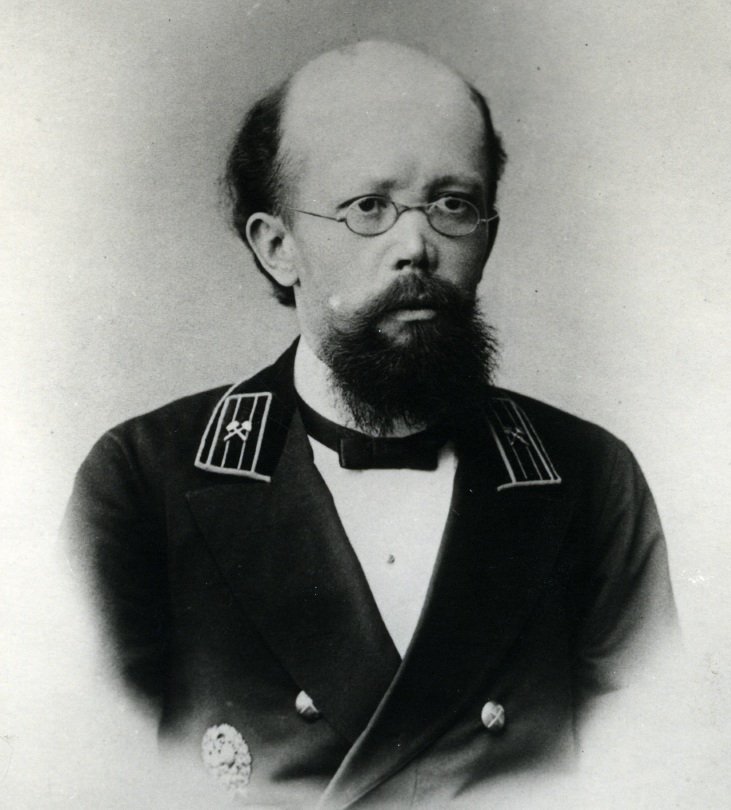
- Born: Nikolay Gavrilovich Slavyanov; 5 May 1854; Nikolskoye, Voronezh Governorate, Russian Empire
- Died: 17 October 1897 (aged 43); Perm, Perm Governorate, Russian Empire
- Education: Saint Petersburg Mining Institute
- Known for: Shielded metal arc welding
- Spouse: Varvara Olderogge (m. 1877)

Nikolay Gavrilovich Slavyanov (Russian: Никола́й Гаври́лович Славя́нов; 5 May [O.S. 23 April] 1854 – 17 October [O.S. 5 October] 1897) was a Russian inventor who in 1888 introduced arc welding with consumable metal electrodes, or shielded metal arc welding, the second historical arc welding method after carbon arc welding invented earlier by Nikolay Benardos.

== Biography ==
Nikolay Slavyanov was born on 5 May 1854 in the village of Nikolskoye, Zadonsky Uyezd, Voronezh Governorate.

Nikolay's father, Gavriil Nikolayevich Slavyanov, was part of the Volyn regiment, where he participated in the Crimean War, during the Battle of Malakoff (part of the Siege of Sebastopol) against French forces. His father retired in 1856 for health reasons. Nikolay's mother, Sofia Alekseyevna (née Shakhovskaya), was the daughter of a Kursk landowner.

Nikolay Slavyanov graduated from the Voronezh gymnasium. From 1872, he studied at the St. Petersburg Mining Institute. Immediately after graduating from the institute in 1877, he was sent to the private Votkinsk State Mining Plant, where progressed from a trainee position to that of inspector of the mechanical and lathe shops, and then went on to become the chief mechanic of the plant. In the autumn of 1877, he married Varvara Vasilyevna Olderogge.

Between 1881 and 1883, he worked at the Omutninsk factories. Then he moved to Perm. From December 1883 until the end of his life, he worked at the Perm cannon factories, where he made most of his inventions.

In 1887, at the Perm cannon factory, he opened a power plant that worked with dynamo machines and arc lamps. The power plant was assigned to illuminate the plant at night.

In Yekaterinburg, in the summer of 1887, a dynamo-car, arc lamps, and various of his electrical measuring instruments were exhibited at a two-week Ural-Siberian scientific and industrial exhibition.

He died on 5 October 1897 from heart rupture. He was buried in the grounds of the Holy Trinity Church. In 1948 he was reburied near the Perm Polytechnic College named after N. G. Slavyanov.

== Scientific studies ==
In November 1888, N.G. Slavyanov made practical use of arc welding for a metal, for the first time in the world. This meant keeping the surface of the metal fluid during casting in order to better degas the casting to avoid blowholes. An electric arc is used for this purpose in the process. In connection with this process, he chosen not to call his method "welding" but rather "electric casting of metals" (Russian: "электрическая отливка металлов"). Before him only carbon electrodes had been used in such processes. Slavyanov worked on improving the quality of the metal needed to forge gun barrels. Metal was poured into a hollow cast, from above, then with the help of the electric arc the metal was heated. The resulting gas bubbles went from bottom to top and the metal lay tightly without seams and slits, the procedure being referred to as the "electrical compaction of metals" (Russian: электрическое уплотнение металлов).

He used this process, for example, to weld the crankshaft of the steam engine in one of the shops of the Perm cannon factories. To demonstrate the capabilities of the welding machine, Nikolay Gavrilovich, having shaped a glass, welded seven non-melting metals and alloys: bell bronze, tombac, nickel, steel, cast iron, copper, nickel silver, and bronze ("Slavyanov's glass", Russian: "Славяновский стакан"). For this innovative contribution to engineering, he received a gold medal at the world electrotechnical exhibition in 1893 in Chicago, with the citation: "For producing a technical revolution."

In metallurgy, N.G. Slavyanov proposed a "vanishing method": in order to eliminate the leakage of molten base and electrode metal, the workpiece consisted of coke or quartz moulding. To protect against the harmful effects of the atmosphere, he proposed closing the welding site with slag, the thickness of which would not prevent the passage of electric current. Slavyanov proposed an automatic regulator of the length of the welding arc, which he called an "electric smelting device," which enabled the use of a dynamo car in place of a storage battery.

== See also ==
- Vasily Vladimirovich Petrov – discoverer of the electric arc effect (1802)
- Humphry Davy – demonstrated electric arc lighting to the Royal Society (1806)
- Nikolay Benardos and Stanisław Olszewski – co-inventors of carbon arc welding (1881)
