= Kakogawa Steel Works =

Coordinates: 34°43′32″N 134°50′12″E

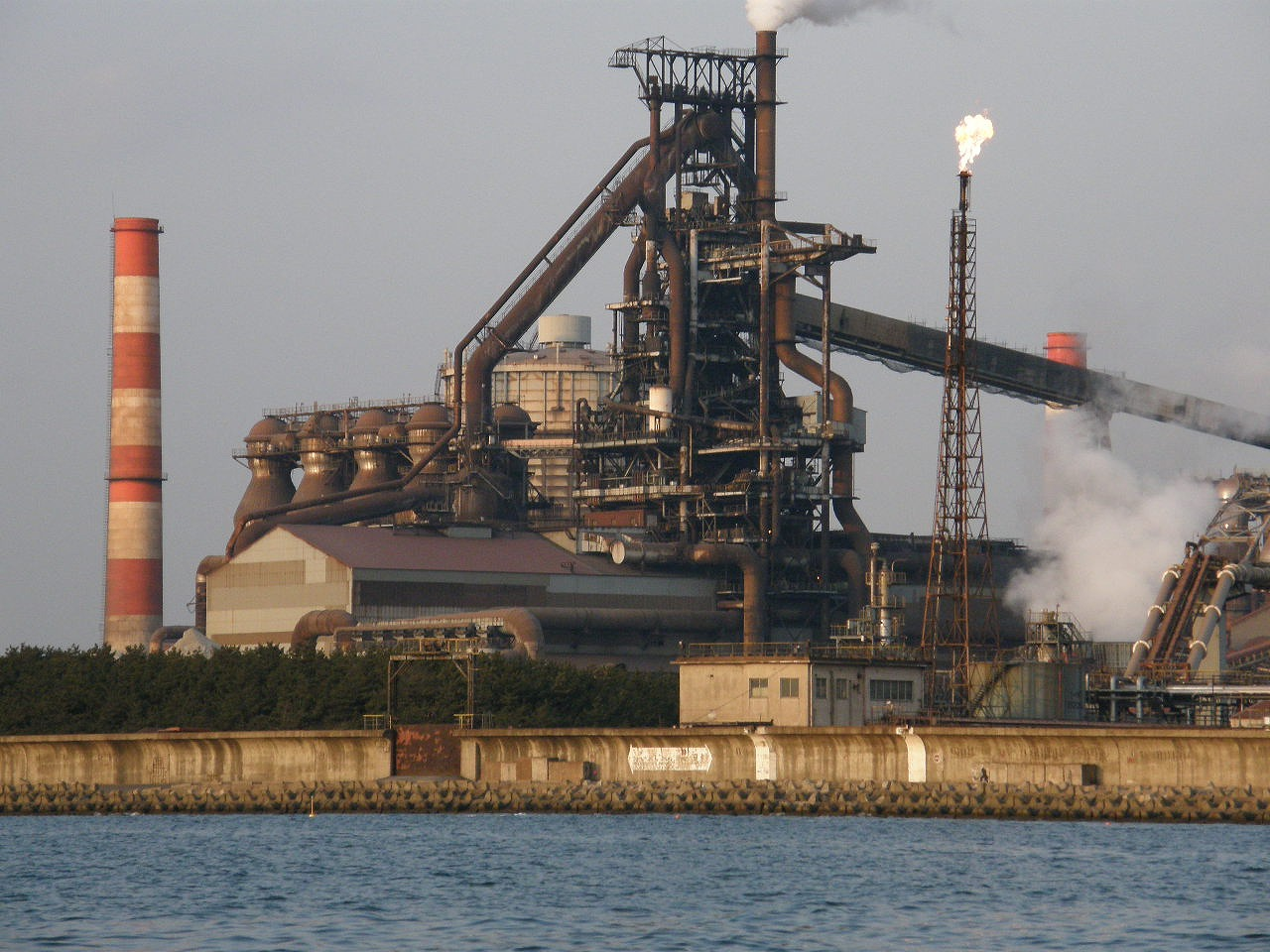
The blast furnace in Kakogawa Works, as viewed from the Inland Sea

Kakogawa Steel Works (Japanese: 加古川製鉄所) is Kobe Steel, Ltd.'s ironworks in Kakogawa, Hyogo, Japan, established in 1969. It is responsible for about 80 percent of the company's iron and steel production.

== In general ==
Kakogawa Steel Works started in 1969 in the reclaimed land on the Inland Sea, in the south of Kakogawa City, with the plate mill, using the hot slabs shipped from Kobe Steel Works, its main ironworks at that time, located in Kobe City. Iron plates mainly for the shipbuilding industry were important to the company because it is also a large producer of welding rods at its Fujisawa works.

In 1970, a blast furnace was added in Kakogawa. (Kobe Steel Works stopped its last remaining blast furnace in 2017.) Later, a hot rolling mill, a cold rolling mill, and iron bar/iron pipes mills were added. It is an "integrated" steel works. Titanium processing mill is also located here, Kobe Steel having handled Titanium since 1954.

Currently, about 80 percent of Kobe Steel's iron and steel production is done in Kakogawa. Since 2007, only two of the three blast furnaces are in service.

== Environmental concern ==
Since Kakogawa has grown into a large city with a population of about 300,000—significantly expanded from 50 years ago—and now stretches to the coastal areas at the mouth of the Kakogawa River near the ironworks, pollution from iron ore and coal material yards has become a serious issue, especially depending on wind direction. In response, dust-prevention nets have recently been installed in the neighboring residential area.

== Data ==
- Space: 510 hectares
- Employees: about 2,500
- Annual pig iron production: 6,000,000 tons (the fifth largest in Japan)

== Transportation ==
- Twenty minutes by taxi from West Japan Railway Company 's Kakogawa Station
- Ten minutes by taxi from Sanyo Electric Railway's Befu Station
- Twenty minutes from Japan National Route 2's Kakogawa Bypass (exit at Kakogawa-Higashi Interchange)

== See also ==
- Kobe Steel
- Japan's Steel Works
