= Twin-carbon arc welding =

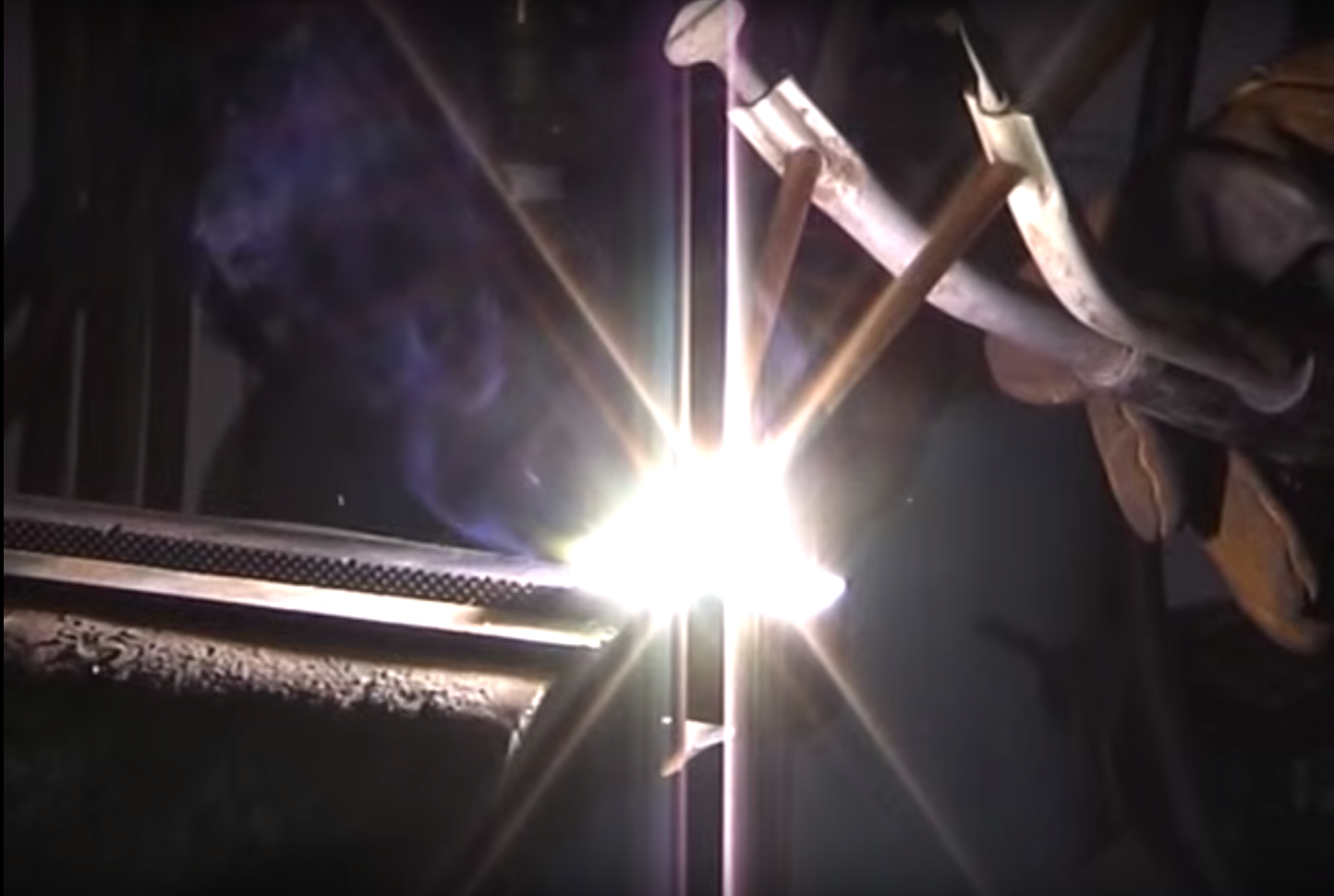
Twin-carbon arc welding in action.

Unlike single-carbon arc welding, in twin-carbon arc welding (TCAW) the arc is maintained between two carbon (graphite) electrodes held in a special holder. AC current is generally used. It was switched on by operating bringing two electrodes closer by a mechanism which also adjusted arc length. The two electrodes touch momentarily, then separate and thus an arc is established. TCAW is unshielded and no artificial pressure is applied.

== History ==
TCAW was first proposed in 1874.

== Use ==
The size of the arc depends upon the distance between the electrode tips, electrode diameters and the welding current. The heat input to the job can be varied by changing the arc size or the distance between the arc and workpiece. After striking the arc, welding can be carried out in the same way as in TIG welding process.

An AC supply is recommended for TCAW. In case a DC supply is used, the positive electrode will disintegrate and consume at a much faster rate as compared to negative electrode, because two-thirds of the total heat is generated at the positive anode. This will produce an unstable arc and require frequent adjustment of the electrodes. In AC welding, because of alternate reversals of polarity, both the electrodes will be affected equally and present no problem.

The electrodes employed for TCAW are approximately of the same diameter as the workpiece thickness. The magnitude of arc current required for welding depends upon both electrode diameter and plate thickness. For example, an 8 mm diameter electrode will need about 65 amps to weld a mild steel sheet of thickness 3.5 mm and 80 Amps to weld a sheet of 6 mm thickness.

TCAW, though more complex than single carbon arc welding, possesses the advantage that arc is independent of the job and can be moved anywhere without getting extinguished. Moreover, the workpiece is not a part of the electrical circuit.

While carbon electrodes have been replaced by tungsten and other alternatives in many places, in developing countries simple twin carbon-arc torches are a cheaper and more sustainable alternative to oxyacetylene torches. A simple version of a TCAW apparatus was designed in Ethiopia, it has reduced costs and improved the accessibility of welding services.
