= EGW =

EGW, E.G.W. is a three-letter abbreviation which may refer to:

- Electrogas welding
- Ellen G. White, a co-founder of the Seventh-day Adventist Church
- External genital warts
