= Kobe Steel =

Japanese steelmaker

Kobe Steel, Ltd.

- Tokyo Head Office
- Trade name: Kobelco
- Native name: 株式会社神戸製鋼所
- Romanized name: Kabushiki Gaisha Kobe Seikosho
- Type: Public (Kabushiki gaisha)
- Traded as: TYO: 5406; NAG: 5406; Nikkei 225 component (TYO)
- Industry: Steel
- Founded: Kobe, Japan (September 1, 1905; 121 years ago)
- Founder: Suzuki Shoten (a trading company); Seiichiro Kobayashi
- Headquarters: ・Kobe HQ; 2-4, Wakinohama-Kaigandori 2-chome, Chūō-ku, Kobe, Hyōgo, 651-8585, Japan ・Tokyo HQ; THE LINKPILLAR 2, 2-22-1 Takanawa, Minato-ku, Tokyo, 108-8688 JAPAN
- Key people: Yoshihiko Katsukawa, (CEO and President)
- Products: Steel & Aluminum; Advanced Materials; Welding; Machinery; Engineering; Construction Machinery; Electric Power
- Revenue: ▼¥2.44 trillion (US$15.39 billion) (FY 2025)
- Net income: ▼¥93.72 billion (US$591.96 million) (FY 2025)
- Total assets: ¥2.87 trillion (US$18.1 billion) (as of March 31, 2026)
- Number of employees: 38,614 (consolidated) (as of March 31, 2026)
- Website: www.kobelco.co.jp/english/

Kobe Steel, Ltd. (株式会社神戸製鋼所, Kabushiki Gaisha Kobe Seikosho) is a major Japanese steel manufacturer headquartered in Chūō-ku, Kobe. Kobelco is the unified brand name of the Kobe Steel Group.

Kobe Steel is a diversified steelmaker with operations in materials, machinery and electric power.

Kobe Steel holds substantial market shares in wire rod, aluminium products for transport equipment and non-standard screw compressors. The company describes its wholesale electricity supply business as one of the largest in Japan.

Kobe Steel was historically affiliated with both the Dai-Ichi Kangyo Bank group and the Sanwa Group. Its shares are listed on the Tokyo Stock Exchange and the Nagoya Stock Exchange. The company is a constituent of the Nikkei 225.

As of 31 March 2026, Kobe Steel had 188 subsidiaries and 44 affiliated companies. Its group companies operate in Japan and elsewhere in Asia, as well as in Europe, the Middle East and the United States. Its major production sites include Kakogawa Works and Takasago Works.

Kobe Steel operates the Kobelco Kobe Steelers rugby union team.

== History ==
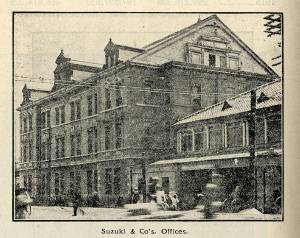
Suzuki Shoten headquarters (formerly Mikado Hotel, before 1918)

In 1905, Suzuki Shoten, a trading company organised as a general partnership, acquired Kobayashi Seikosho, a steelworks run by Seiichiro Kobayashi in Wakinohama, Kobe, and renamed it Kobe Seikosho. In 1911, Suzuki Shoten spun off the business and incorporated it as Kobe Steel Works, Ltd., in Wakinohamacho, Kobe.

Orders from the Kure Naval Arsenal and other naval arsenals helped sustain the company in its early years. Around 1914, Kobe Steel entered the machinery business by developing air compressors and marine steam engines. The shipbuilding boom during the First World War boosted demand for its steel castings and forgings. In 1918, the company acquired diesel engine manufacturing rights from the Swiss firm Sulzer.

Kobe Steel entered the engineering business in 1926 with a cement plant project. In 1930, it completed the first electric mining shovel made in Japan, marking its entry into the construction machinery business. It expanded into aluminium in 1937 and welding in 1940.

During Japan's period of rapid post-war growth, Kobe Steel expanded its steel and aluminium production capacity. In 1959, it commissioned its first blast furnace at Kobe Works, establishing an integrated operation capable of producing steel from iron ore. The Moka plant, which became a centre for aluminium rolling, began operating in 1969. The No. 1 blast furnace at Kakogawa Works entered service in 1970.

The No. 3 blast furnace at Kobe Works was damaged and shut down during the Great Hanshin–Awaji earthquake in January 1995. Equipment damage and business interruption cost the company about ¥100 billion. The furnace returned to service about two and a half months later, and its restart became a symbol of Kobe's recovery.

Kobe Steel drew on its experience generating electricity for its steelworks to enter the wholesale power business in 1996. In 1999, it combined its construction machinery division with two affiliated companies to form Kobelco Construction Machinery. The first unit at Kobe Power Plant began commercial operation in 2002.

In October 2017, Kobe Steel shut down the No. 3 blast furnace at Kobe Works and consolidated its upstream ironmaking and steelmaking operations at Kakogawa Works to improve the competitiveness of its steel business. The Kobe site, now known as the Kobe Wire Rod & Bar Plant, produces special steel wire rods and bars from semi-finished steel supplied by Kakogawa.

=== Steel and aluminium ===
Kobe Steel produces aluminium sheet for vehicle body panels and other automotive applications. On 8 August 2024, it signed an agreement with Baoshan Iron & Steel (Baosteel) and Baowu Aluminum Technology to form a joint venture for the heat treatment and finishing of automotive aluminium sheet. The joint venture was registered in China on 9 January 2025.

=== Engineering ===
Kobe Steel's engineering business has supplied iron ore pellet plants in Japan and abroad. Its overseas projects include the pellet plant in Huasco, Chile, which began operating in 1978.

== Notable former employee ==
Shinzō Abe, who later served as Japan's prime minister, joined Kobe Steel in 1979 and worked at Kakogawa Works before entering politics.

== Main locations ==
=== Domestic Locations ===
- Kobe Head Office
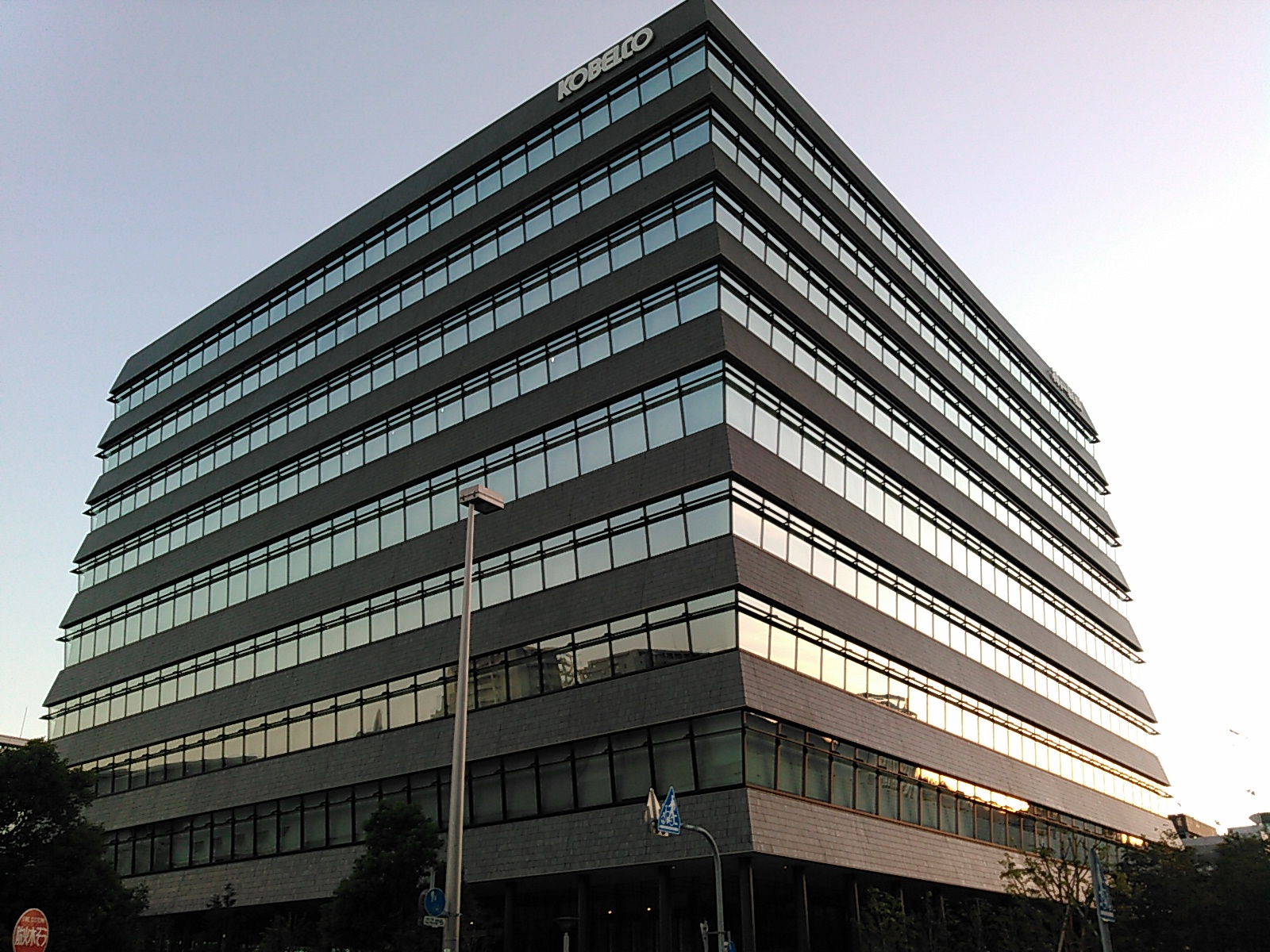
  Kobe Steel Kobe headquarters
- Tokyo Head Office
- Takasago Works
- Kobe Corporate Research Laboratories
- Kakogawa Works
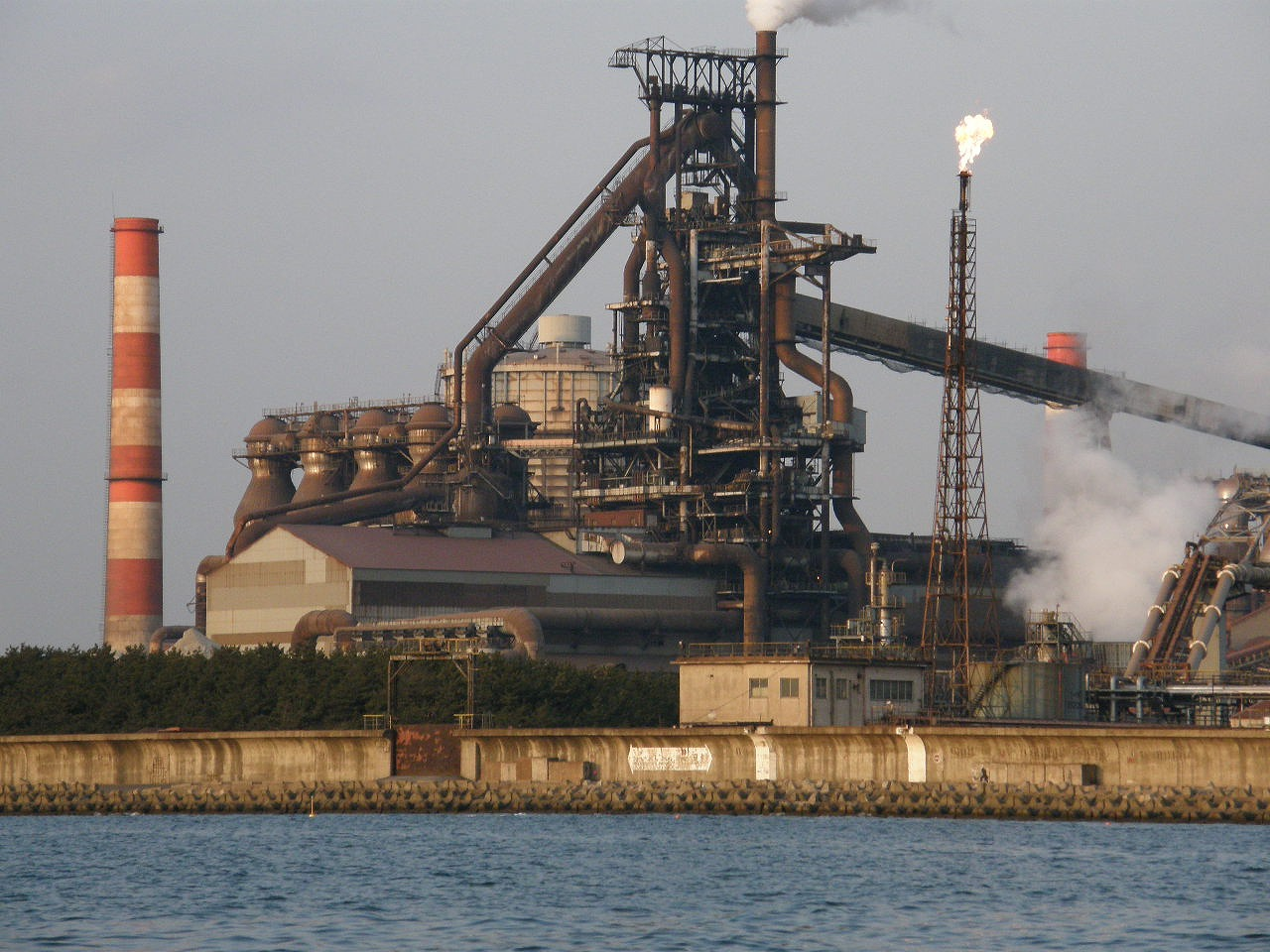
  Kakogawa Works
- Research & Development Laboratory
- Kobe Wire Rod & Bar Plant
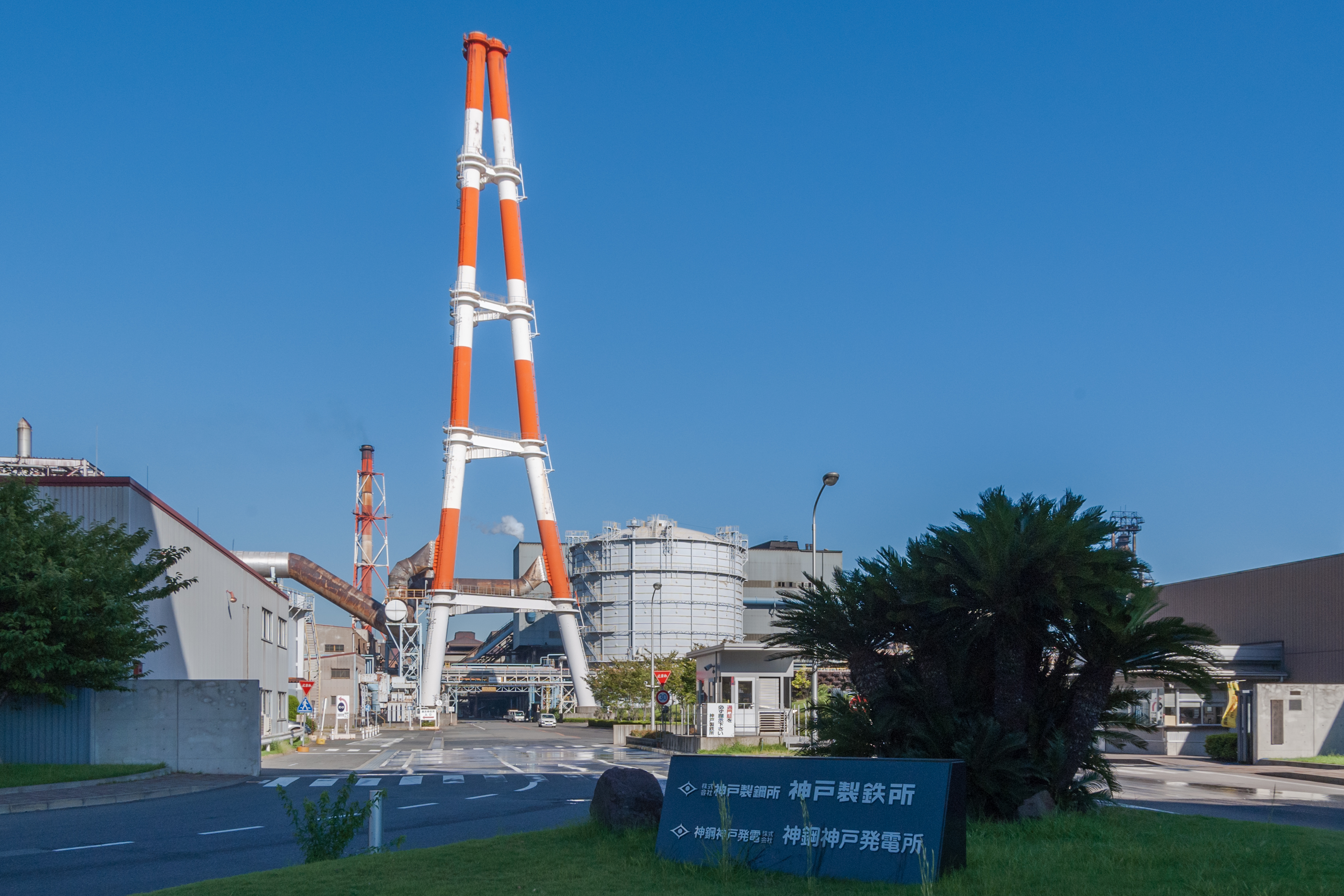
  Kobe Wire Rod & Bar Plant
- Fujisawa Office
- Ibaraki Plant
- Saijo Plant
- Fukuchiyama Plant
- Moka Works
- Chofu Works
- Daian Works

=== Overseas Regional Headquarters and Offices ===
- Kobe Steel USA Inc. (U.S. headquarters): 19575 Victor Parkway, Suite 200 Livonia, MI, 48152, USA
- Kobelco (China) Holding Co., Ltd. (China headquarters, investment company): Room 3701, Hong Kong New World Tower, No.300 Middle Huai Hai Zhong Road, Huangpu District, Shanghai, 200021, People's Republic of China
- Kobelco (China) Holding Co., Ltd. (Guangzhou Branch): Room 1203, #285 East Linhe Road, Tianhe District, Guangzhou City, Guangdong Province, People's Republic of China
- Kobelco South East Asia Ltd. (Regional headquarters for Southeast Asia and South Asia): 17th Floor, Sathorn Thani Tower ll, 92/49 North Sathorn Road, Khwaeng Silom, Khet Bangrak, Bangkok, 10500, Kingdom of Thailand
- Kobelco Europe GmbH (Regional Headquarters for Europe and the Middle East): Luitpoldstrasse 3, 80335 Munich, Germany

== Business Units & Main Products ==
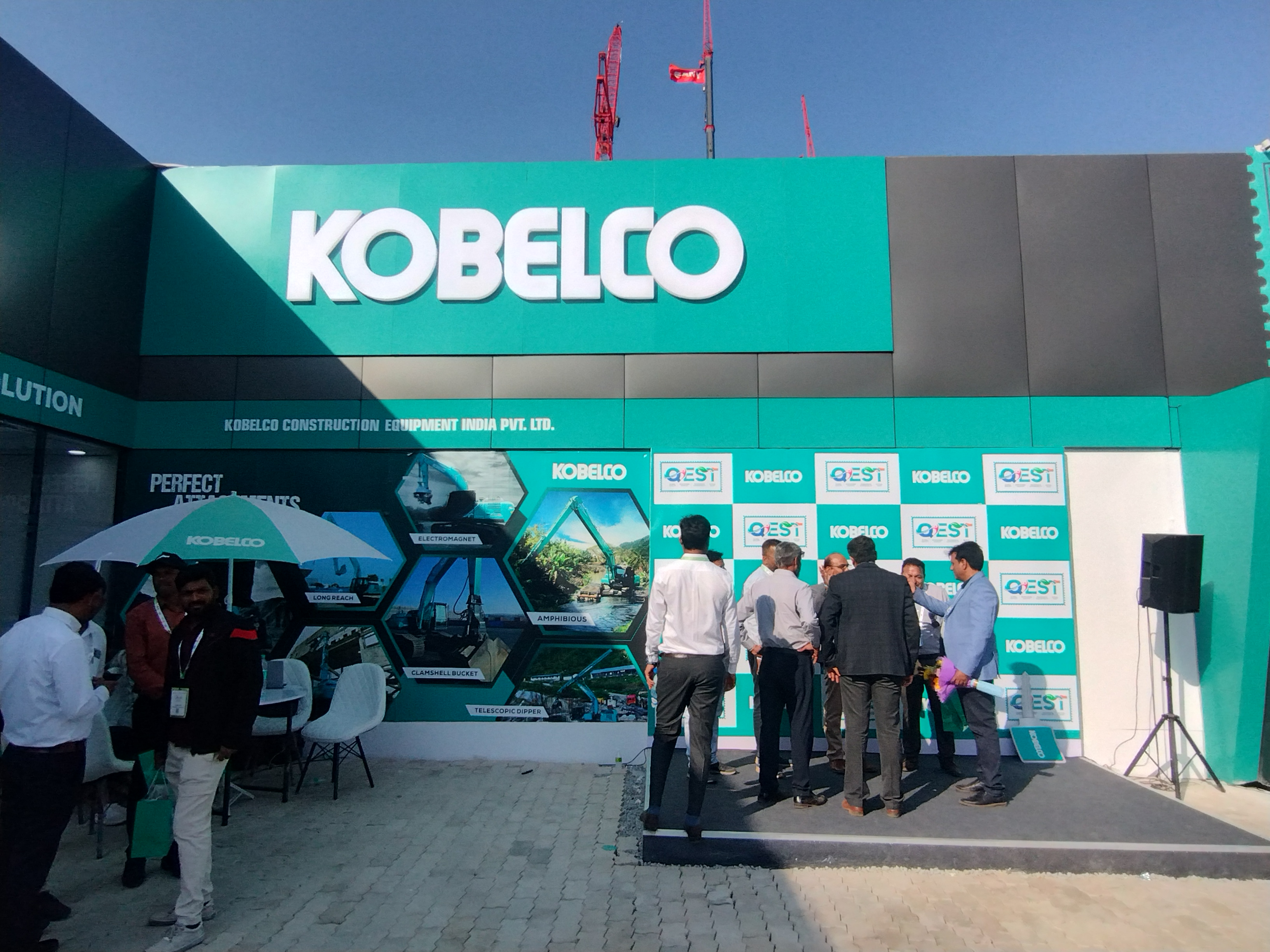
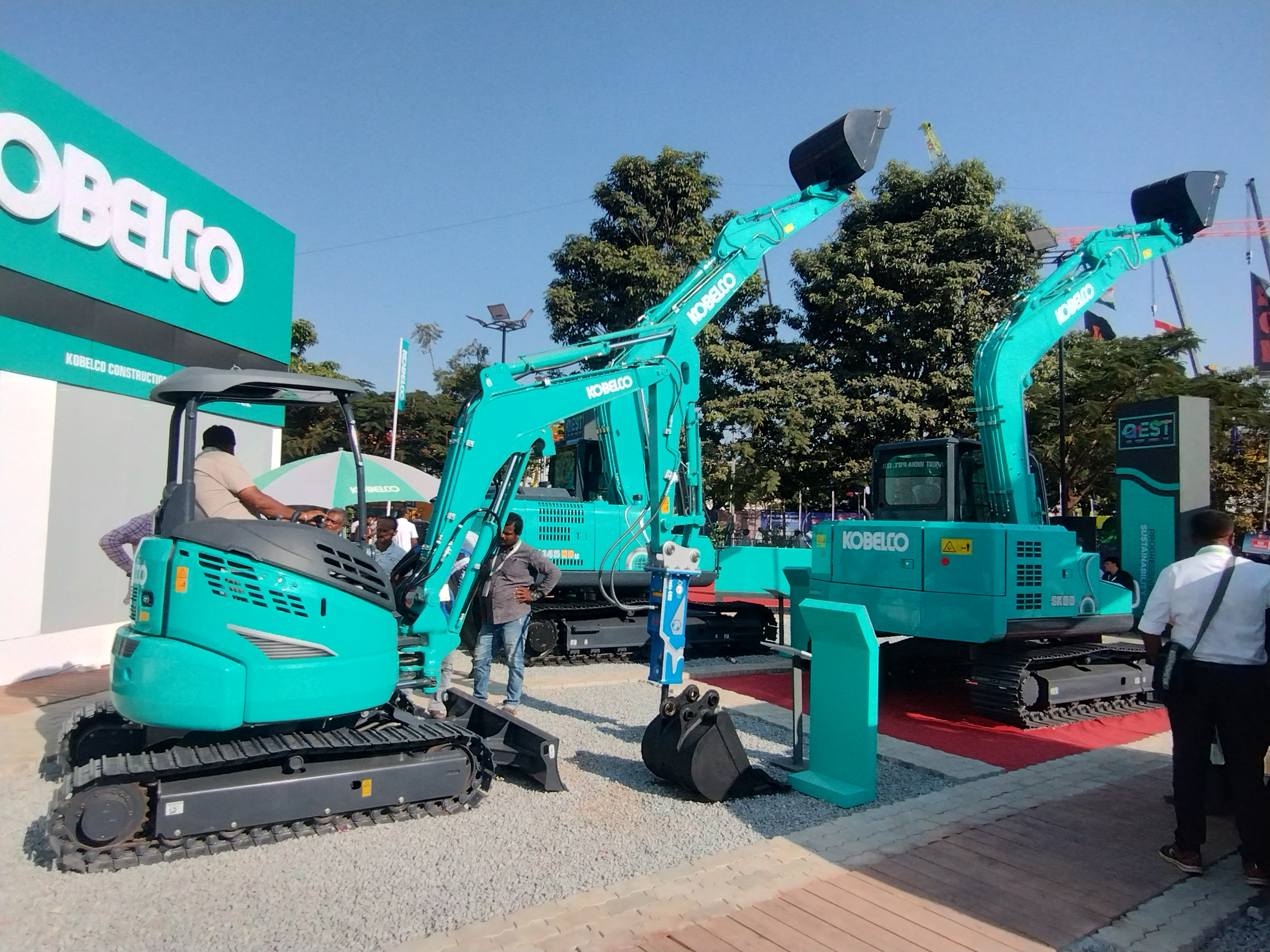
Kobelco at EXCON 2025, BIEC

=== Steel & Aluminum ===
- Steel Sheets
- Wire Rods and Bars
- Aluminum Plate
- Steel Plates

=== Welding ===
- Robots and Electric Power Sources
- Welding Materials

=== Advanced Materials ===
- Steel Castings and Forgings
- Titanium
- Copper Sheet and Strip
- Steel Powder

=== Machinery ===
- Standard Compressors
- Rotating Machinery
- Tire and Rubber Machinery
- Plastic Processing Machinery
- Advanced Technology Equipment
- Rolling Mill・Press Machine
- Ultra High Pressure Equipment
- Energy & Chemical Field

=== Engineering ===
- Iron Unit Field
- Advanced Urban Transit System

=== Electric Power ===
- Wholesale Power Supply

== Scandal ==
In October 2017, Kobe Steel admitted to falsifying data on the strength and durability of its aluminium, copper and steel products. The scandal deepened when the company said it found falsified data on its iron ore powder, which caused its shares to fall 18%. By 11 October, shares had fallen by a third. After testing the parts of their bullet trains, the Central Japan Railway Company announced that 310 components were discovered to contain sub-standard parts supplied by Kobe Steel.

Following further news in October 2017 that car makers Toyota, Nissan, and General Motors, and train manufacturer Hitachi, were among 200 companies affected by the Kobe Steel's mislabelling, which had potential safety implications for their vehicles, the CEO of Kobe Steel conceded that his company now had "zero credibility". Other affected companies include Ford, Boeing and Mitsubishi Heavy Industries. CEO Kawasaki promised to lead an internal investigation. On 13 October 2017, Kobe Steel admitted that the number of companies misled was over 500.

Despite the costs of dealing with the scandal, Kobe Steel issued a revised profit forecast in February 2018 announcing that it expects to generate a net profit of ¥45 billion ($421 million) for the full 2017 fiscal year, marking its first net profit in three years.

== Gallery ==
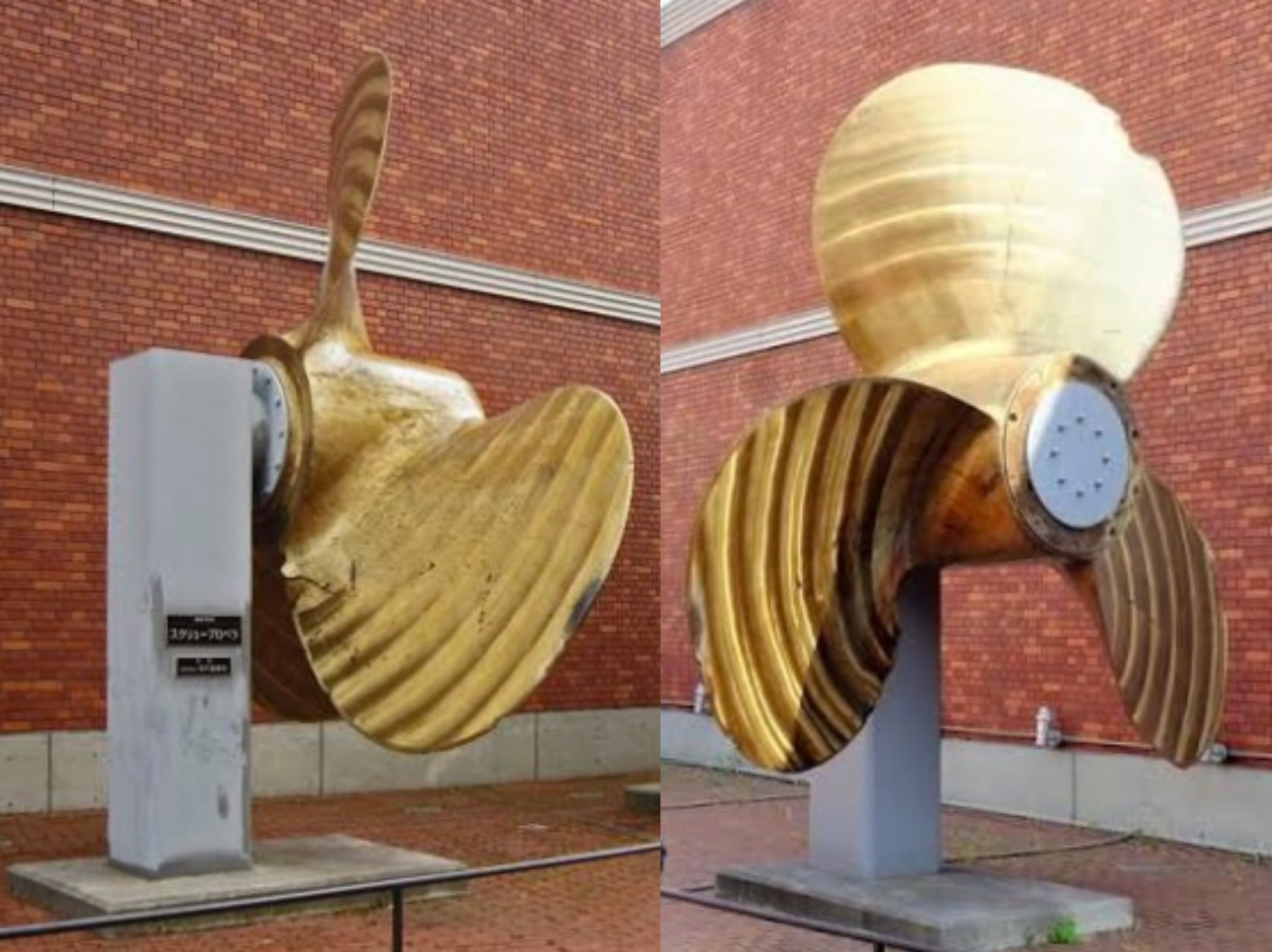
Screw of IJN Battleship Mutsu, donated by Kobe Steel (Yamato Museum)

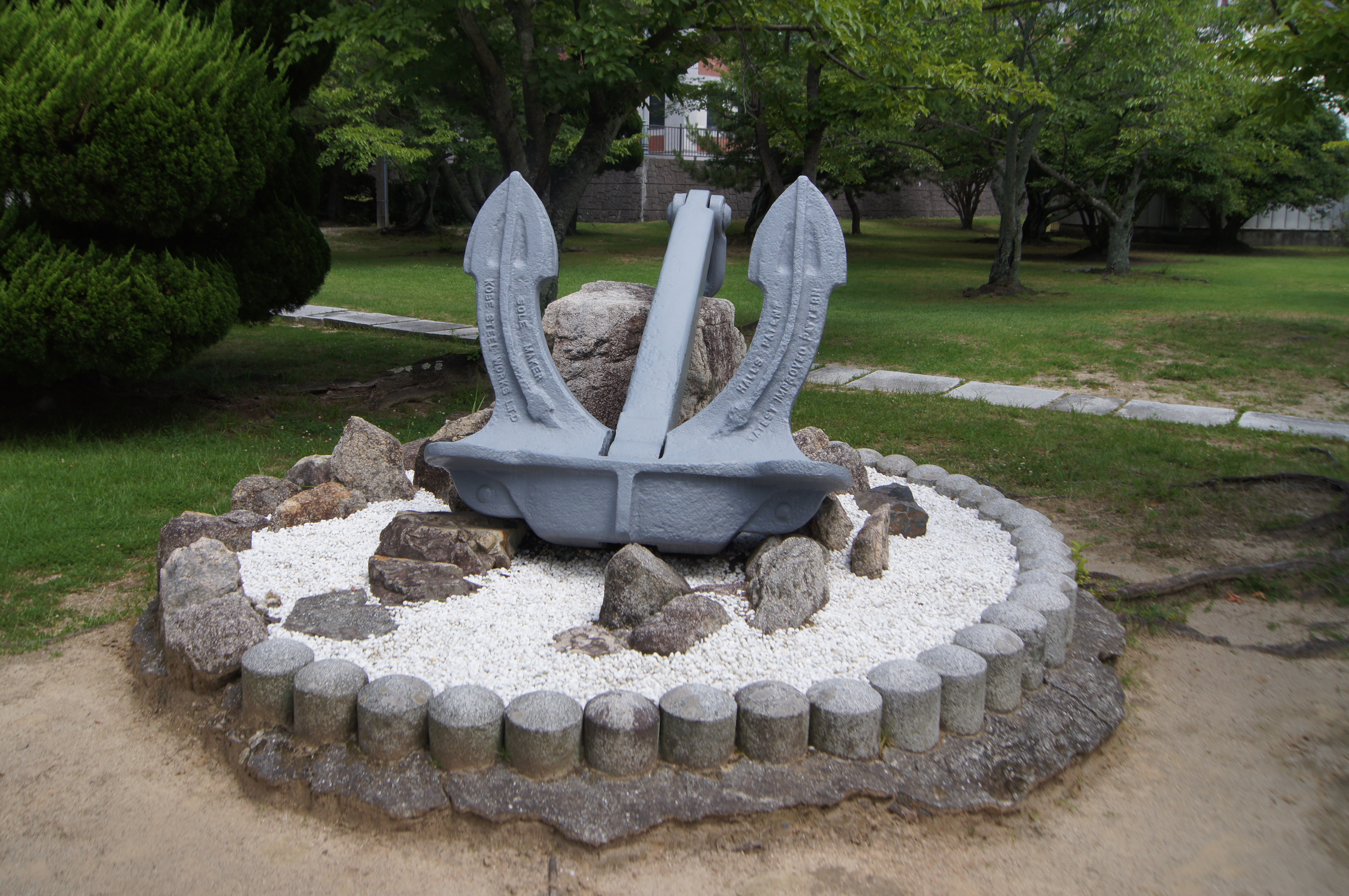
Main anchor of IJN destroyer Yukikaze with the engraving 'KOBE STEEL WORKS LTD' (JMSDF the First Service School)

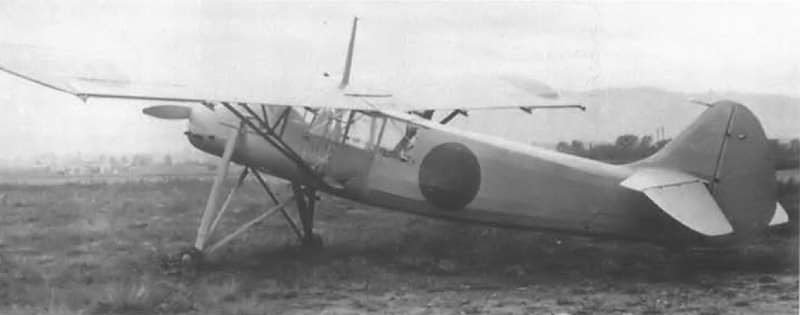
IJA Kobeseiko Te-Gō

== See also ==
- Kobeseiko Te-Gō
