= Stanisław Olszewski =

Polish engineer and inventor (1852–1898)

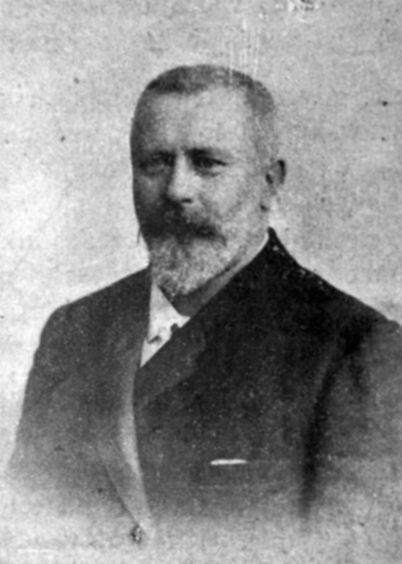
- Stanisław Olszewski photo from Polish weekly magazine Tygodnik Illustrowany, 1898.
- Born: 6 January 1852; Warsaw, Congress Poland
- Died: 15 July 1898 (aged 46); Giessen, Grand Duchy of Hesse, German Empire
- Education: Main School of Warsaw; University of Liège
- Known for: Co-inventor of carbon arc welding technology
- Children: 4, including Antoni Olszewski
- Engineering career
- Discipline: Engineerng; Welding

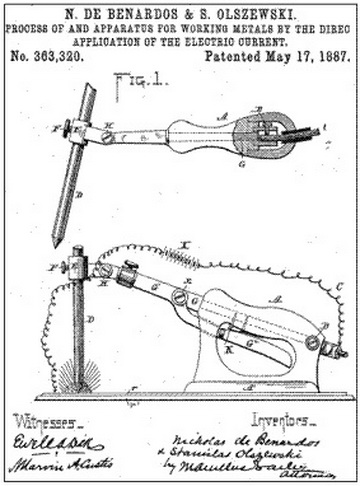
The patent for the carbon arc welding method named Elektrogefest ("Electric Hephaestus") granted to Nicholas de Bernardos and Stanisław Olszewski in 1887

Stanisław Olszewski (Polish: [staˈɲiswaf ɔlˈʂɛfski]; 6 January 1852 – 15 July 1898) was a Polish engineer and inventor. A graduate of the University of Liège, he is best known as the co-creator of the technology of arc welding (along with Nikolay Benardos).

== Biography ==
Olszewski was born on 6 January 1852 in Warsaw as the son of Antoni, an official of the Insurance Directorate, and Kamila (née Starczewska). His family was of noble origin and bore the Kościesza coat of arms. After completing his secondary education, Olszewski enrolled at the Main School of Warsaw (Polish: Szkoła Główna Warszawska). When the institution was closed in 1869 as part of Russian repressions following the January Uprising, Olszewski travelled to Belgium to continue his studies and entered the Technical Department of the University of Liège. In 1875, he earned his engineering diploma there.

Upon his return to Poland (Privislinsky Krai, Russian Empire), he became one of technical directors in the Joint-Stock Industrial Company of Mechanical Works of the Lilpop, Rau i Loewenstein factory in Warsaw, and then the company's representative for all of Russian Empire. He also served as a general secretary of three Russian technological syndicates and simultaneously started his own company in Saint Petersburg.

In 1881–82, together with Nikolay Benardos, a Russian engineer, he developed a method of carbon arc welding patented in France in 1885 and in the US in 1887. Both engineers also designed all the components now used in the arc‑welding process, including the original AC‑powered transformer welding machine, the electrode held in a clamp (at the time a non-consumable carbon electrode), the ground clamp, and the cables connecting the entire system. The invention was later known as Elektrogefest ("Electric Hephaestus"), named after the Greek god of fire and metallurgy. Their method was groundbreaking as arc welding greatly broadened welding’s practical uses by enabling metals to be joined more quickly and with improved precision.

He was also a known benefactor and sponsor of, among others, the Polish gymnasium in Cieszyn. Olszewski helped Polish youth studying in schools and universities of Saint Petersburg. He was active in the Catholic Charity Association at the Church of st. Catherine in Saint Petersburg. He died 15 July 1898 in Giessen. His body was then transported to Poland and buried at the Powązki Cemetery.

== Remembrance ==
Before the centenary of the invention of arc welding, the Welding Section of the Association of Polish Mechanical Engineers and Technicians undertook efforts to restore public awareness of Olszewski’s life and achievements. During the 1980s, the Section carried out scholarly research and an international search for patent documentation.

To commemorate the inventor, an expanded meeting of the Section’s Main Board, held on 15 November 1985, resolved to issue a special medal bearing Olszewski’s likeness on the occasion of the 100th anniversary of the invention of arc welding. In 1987, the medal was struck by the Mint of Poland, and since then, under the name the Stanisław Olszewski Medal, it has been awarded in Poland to distinguished welding specialists.

In 1985, a historical session marking the centenary of the invention of arc welding was also held in London. At this event, Professor Leszek Nekanda‑Trepka, representing the editorial board of Przegląd Spawalniczy magazine, delivered a paper dedicated to Olszewski, titled "Stanisław Olszewski as Co‑owner of the Patents Granted to Benardos and Olszewski for the Arc‑Welding Process". The paper was subsequently published in print. The organizers additionally invited surviving members of engineer Olszewski’s family, including his granddaughter, Mary Grand.

== See also ==
- List of Polish engineers
- Timeline of Polish science and technology

== Links ==
- (in Polish) Stanisław Olszewski
