= Submerged arc welding =

Joining metals using electricity, beneath a granulated flux material

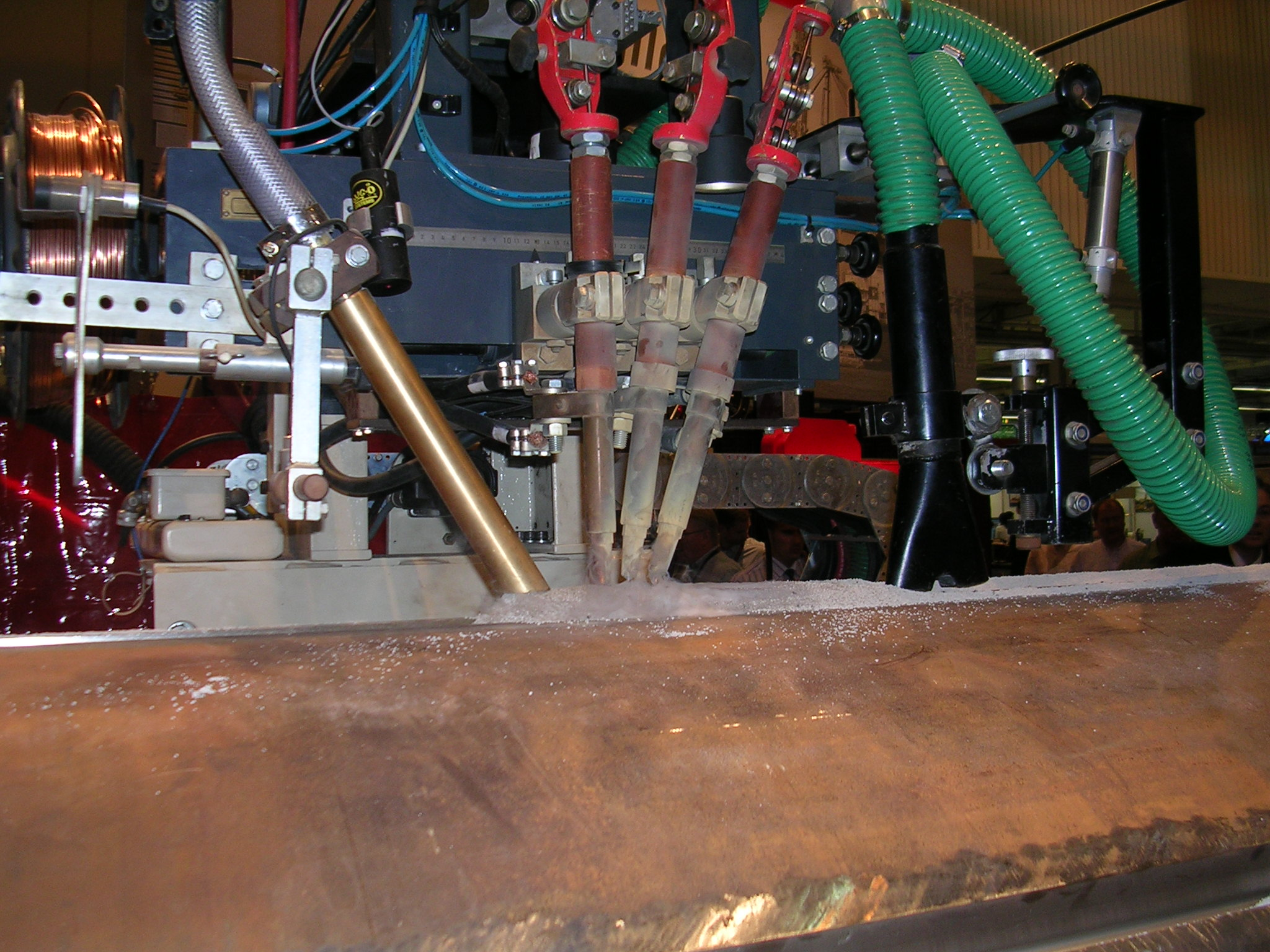
Submerged arc welding. The welding head moves from right to left. The flux powder is supplied by the hopper on the left hand side, then follow three filler wire guns and finally a vacuum cleaner.

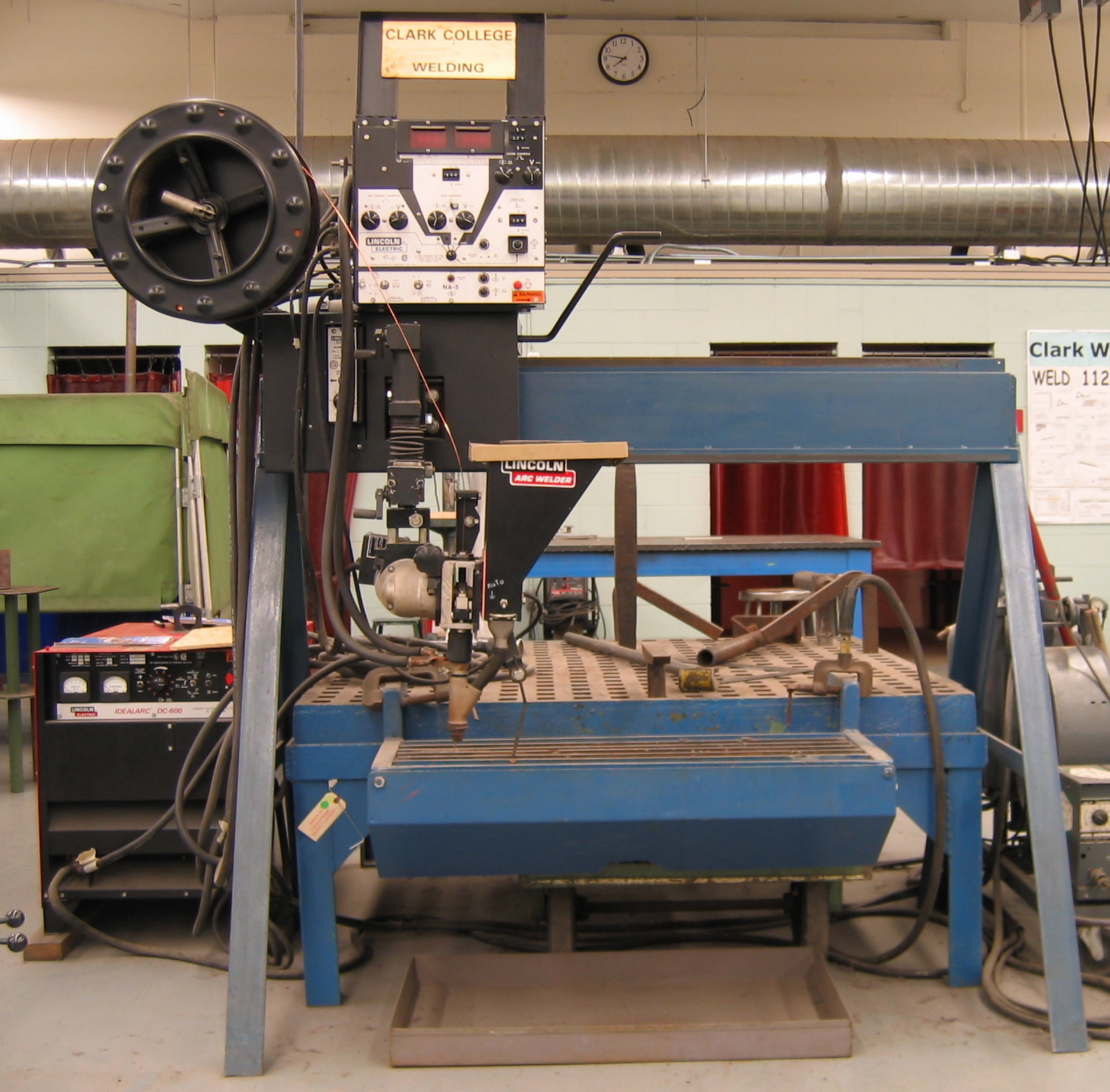
A submerged arc welder used for training

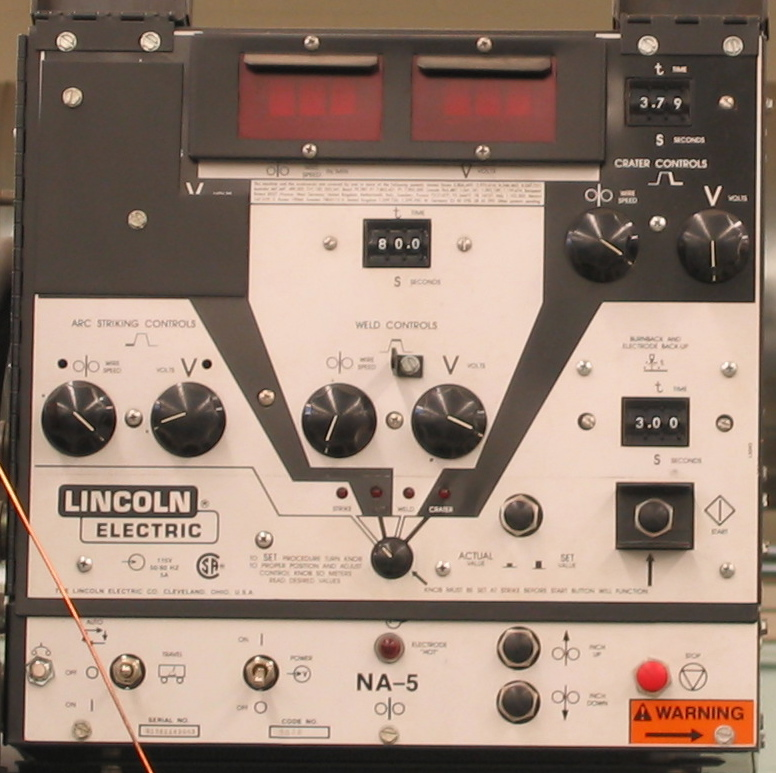
Close-up view of the control panel

A schematic of submerged arc welding

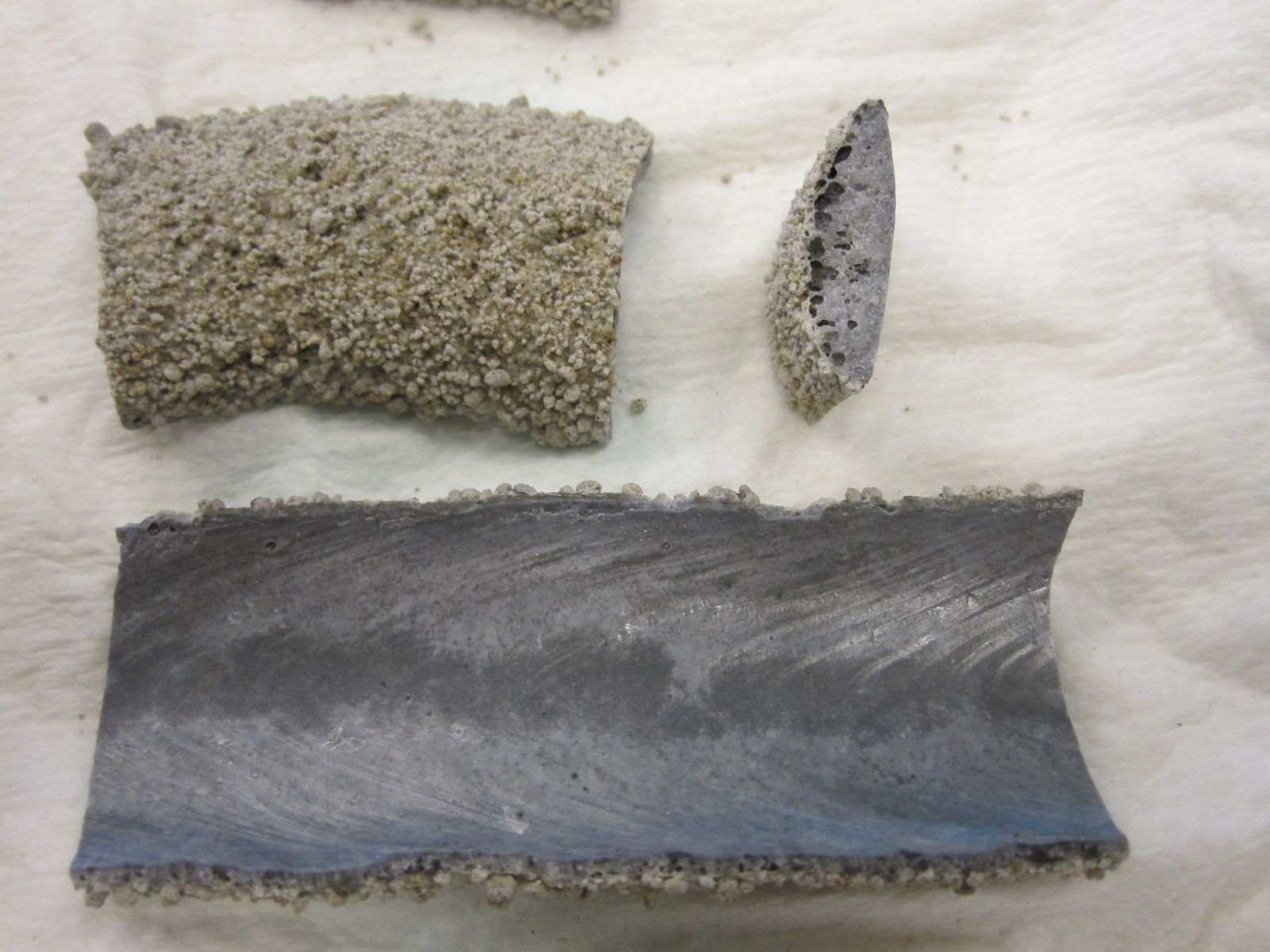
Pieces of slag from submerged arc welding exhibiting glassy surface due to silica (SiO_{2}).

Submerged arc welding (SAW) is a common arc welding process. The first SAW patent was taken out in 1935. The process requires a continuously fed consumable solid or tubular (metal cored) electrode. The molten weld and the arc zone are protected from atmospheric contamination by being "submerged" under a blanket of granular fusible flux consisting of lime, silica, manganese oxide, calcium fluoride, and other compounds. When molten, the flux becomes conductive, and provides a current path between the electrode and the work. This thick layer of flux completely covers the molten metal thus preventing spatter and sparks as well as suppressing the intense ultraviolet radiation and fumes that are a part of the shielded metal arc welding (SMAW) process.

SAW is normally operated in the automatic or mechanized mode, however, semi-automatic (hand-held) SAW guns with pressurized or gravity flux feed delivery are available. The process is normally limited to the flat or horizontal-fillet welding positions (although horizontal groove position welds have been done with a special arrangement to support the flux). Deposition rates approaching 45 kg/h (100 lb/h) have been reported — this compares to ~5 kg/h (10 lb/h) (max) for shielded metal arc welding. Although currents ranging from 300 to 2000 A are commonly utilized, currents of up to 5000 A have also been used (multiple arcs).

Single or multiple (2 to 5) electrode wire variations of the process exist. SAW strip-cladding utilizes a flat strip electrode (e.g. 60 mm wide x 0.5 mm thick). DC or AC power can be used, and combinations of DC and AC are common on multiple electrode systems. Constant voltage welding power supplies are most commonly used; however, constant current systems in combination with a voltage sensing wire-feeder are available.

== Features ==
=== Welding head ===
It feeds flux and filler metal to the welding joint. The electrode (filler metal) gets energized here.

=== Flux hopper ===
It stores the flux and controls the rate of flux deposition on the welding joint.

=== Flux ===
The granulated flux shields and thus protects molten weld from atmospheric contamination. The flux cleans weld metal and can also modify its chemical composition. The flux is granulated to a definite size. It may be of fused, bonded or mechanically mixed type. The flux may consist of fluorides of calcium and oxides of calcium, magnesium, silicon, aluminium and manganese compounds. Alloying elements may be added as per requirements. Substances involving large amounts of gas during welding are never mixed with the flux. Flux with fine and coarse particle sizes are recommended for welding heavier and smaller thickness respectively.

=== Electrode ===
SAW filler material usually is a standard wire as well as other special forms. This wire normally has a thickness of 1.6 mm to 6 mm (1/16 in. to 1/4 in.). In certain circumstances, twisted wire can be used to give the arc an oscillating movement. This helps fuse the toe of the weld to the base metal. The electrode composition depends upon the material being welded. Alloying elements may be added in the electrodes. Electrodes are available to weld mild steels, high carbon steels, low and special alloy steels, stainless steel and some of the nonferrous of copper and nickel. Electrodes are generally copper coated to prevent rusting and to increase their electrical conductivity. Electrodes are available in straight lengths and coils. Their diameters may be 1.6, 2.0, 2.4, 3, 4.0, 4.8, and 6.4 mm. The approximate value of currents to weld with 1.6, 3.2 and 6.4 mm diameter electrodes are 150–350, 250–800 and 650–1350 amps respectively.

== Welding Operation ==
The flux starts depositing on the joint to be welded. Since the flux is not electrically conductive when cold, the arc may be struck either by touching the electrode with the work piece or by placing steel wool between electrode and job before switching on the welding current or by using a high frequency unit. In all cases the arc is struck under a cover of flux. Flux otherwise is an insulator but once it melts due to heat of the arc, it becomes highly conductive and hence the current flow is maintained between the electrode and the workpiece through the molten flux. The upper portion of the flux, in contact with atmosphere, which is visible remains granular (unchanged) and can be reused. The lower, melted flux becomes slag, which is waste material and must be removed after welding.

The electrode is continuously fed to the joint to be welded at a predetermined speed. In semi-automatic welding sets the welding head is moved manually along the joint. In automatic welding a separate drive moves either the welding head over the stationary job or the job moves/rotates under the stationary welding head.

The arc length is kept constant by using the principle of a self-adjusting arc. If the arc length decreases, arc voltage will increase, arc current and therefore burn-off rate will increase thereby causing the arc to lengthen. The reverse occurs if the arc length increases more than the normal.

A backing plate of steel or copper may be used to control penetration and to support large amounts of molten metal associated with the process.

=== Key SAW process variables ===
- Wire feed speed (main factor in welding current control)
- Arc voltage
- Travel speed
- Electrode stick-out (ESO) or contact tip to work (CTTW)
- Polarity and current type (AC or DC) and variable balance AC current

== Material applications ==
- Carbon steels (structural and vessel construction)
- Low alloy steels
- Stainless steels
- Nickel-based alloys
- Surfacing applications (wear-facing, build-up, and corrosion resistant overlay of steels)

== Advantages ==
- High deposition rates (over 45 kg/h (100 lb/h) have been reported).
- High operating factors in mechanized applications.
- Deep weld penetration.
- Sound welds are readily made (with good process design and control).
- High speed welding of thin sheet steels up to 5 m/min (16 ft/min) is possible.
- Welding fumes and arc flash is eliminated or minimized.
- Practically no edge preparation is necessary depending on joint configuration and required penetration.
- The process is suitable for both indoor and outdoor works.
- Welds produced are sound, uniform, ductile, corrosion resistant and have good impact value.
- Single pass welds can be made in thick plates with normal equipment.
- The arc is always covered under a blanket of flux, thus there is no chance of spatter of weld.
- 50% to 90% of the flux is recoverable, recycled and reused.

== Limitations ==
- Limited to ferrous (steel or stainless steels) and some nickel-based alloys.
- Normally limited to the 1F, 1G, and 2F positions.
- Normally limited to long straight seams or rotated pipes or vessels.
- Requires relatively troublesome flux handling systems.
- Flux and slag residue can present a health and safety concern.
- Requires inter-pass and post weld slag removal.
- Requires backing strips for proper root penetration.
- Limited to high thickness materials.
