= Main School of Warsaw =

Former University of Warsaw (1862 to 1869)

The Main School of Warsaw (Polish: Szkoła Główna Warszawska) was an educational institution in Warsaw, Poland, operating from 1862 to 1869 with lectures conducted in Polish.

== History ==
Established in June 1862 by the director of the Government Commission of Religious Denominations and Public Enlightenment, Aleksander Wielopolski, under the decree of Emperor Alexander II of Russia, the Warsaw Main School was created by reorganizing the dissolved Medical and Surgical Academy in 1862. It occupied the buildings of the University of Warsaw, which had been closed in 1831 by Russian authorities. The first rector was Józef Mianowski.

The institution was closed in November 1869 as part of the repressive measures following the January Uprising.

== Faculties ==
- Law and Administration
- Philological-Historical
- Mathematical-Physical
- Medical

== Bibliography ==
- Cywińska, Alina; Nalewajska, Lilianna (2012). Mistrzowie i przewodnicy. Profesorowie Warszawskiej Szkoły Głównej (1862–1869). Warsaw: Muzeum Uniwersytetu Warszawskiego. ISBN 978-83-62844-26-5.
