= Electrogas welding =

Electrogas welding (EGW) is a continuous vertical-position arc welding process developed in 1961 in which an arc is struck between a consumable electrode and the workpiece. A shielding gas is sometimes used, but pressure is not applied. A major difference between EGW and its cousin, electroslag welding, is that the arc in EGW is not extinguished but instead remains struck throughout the welding process. It is used to make square-groove welds for butt and t-joints, especially in the shipbuilding industry and in the construction of storage tanks.

== Operation ==
In EGW, the heat of the welding arc causes the electrode and workpieces to melt and flow into the cavity between the parts being welded. This molten metal solidifies from the bottom up, joining the parts being welded together. The weld area is protected from atmospheric contamination by a separate shielding gas, or by the gas produced by the disintegration of a flux-cored electrode wire. The electrode is guided into the weld area by either a consumable electrode guide tube, like the one used in electroslag welding, or a moving head. When the consumable guide tube is used, the weld pool is composed of molten metal coming from the parts being welded, the electrode, and the guide tube. The moving head variation uses an assembly of an electrode guide tube which travels upwards as the weld is laid, keeping it from melting.

Electrogas welding can be applied to most steels, including low- and medium-carbon steels, low-alloy high-strength steels, and some stainless steels. Quenched and tempered steels may also be welded by the process, provided that the proper amount of heat is applied. Welds must be vertical, varying to either side by a maximum of 15 degrees. In general, the workpiece must be at least 10 mm (0.4 in) thick, while the maximum thickness for one electrode is approximately 20 mm (0.8 in). Additional electrodes make it possible to weld thicker workpieces. The height of the weld is limited only by the mechanism used to lift the welding head—in general, it ranges from 100 mm (4 in) to 20 m (50 ft).

Like other arc welding processes, EGW requires that the operator wear a welding helmet and proper attire to prevent exposure to molten metal and the bright welding arc. Compared to other processes, a large amount of molten metal is present during welding, and this poses an additional safety and fire hazard. Since the process is often performed at great heights, the work and equipment must be properly secured, and the operator should wear a safety harness to prevent injury in the event of a fall.

== Equipment ==
EGW uses a constant voltage, direct current welding power supply, and the electrode has positive polarity. The welding current can range from 100 to 800 A, and the voltage can range between 30 and 50 V. A wire feeder is used to supply the electrode, which is selected based on the material being welded. The electrode can be flux-cored to provide the weld with protection from atmospheric contamination, or a shielding gas—generally carbon dioxide—can be used with a solid wire electrode. The welding head is attached to an apparatus that elevates during the welding process. Also attached to the apparatus are backing shoes, which restrain the weld to the width of the workpieces. To prevent them from melting, they are made of copper and are water-cooled. They must be fitted tightly against the joint to prevent leaks.
