= Nikolay Benardos =

Russian inventor (1842–1905)

Nikolay Nikolayevich Benardos
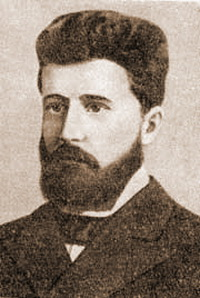
- Born: July 8, 1842; Benardosivka, Kherson Governorate, Russian Empire (now Ukraine)
- Died: September 21, 1905 (aged 63); Fastiv, Russian Empire (now Ukraine)

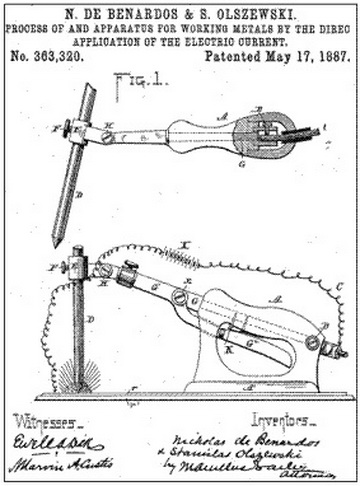
The patent for the arc welding method named Elektrogefest ("Electric Hephaestus") granted to Benardos and his sponsor Stanisław Olszewski in 1887

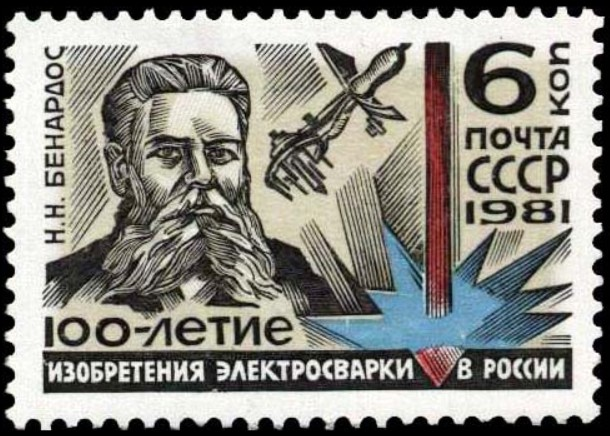
A Soviet postage stamp dedicated to the hundredth anniversary of the invention of arc welding

Nikolay Nikolayevich Benardos (Ukrainian: Микола Миколайович Бенардо́с; 1842–1905) was a Ukrainian inventor of Greek descent who in 1881 introduced carbon arc welding, which was the first practical arc welding method.

== Biography ==
Nikolay Benardos was born on July 8, 1842, in Benardosivka, Kherson Governorate, Russian Empire (now Ukraine).

During the 1860s and 1870s he investigated the electric arc, and he worked on this in Moscow, St. Petersburg and Kineshma. Nikolay Benardos was the first to apply an electric arc to heat the edges of the steel sheets to the plastic state. He demonstrated a new way of metal compounds in Paris in 1881.

He could not stay in the capital due to his financial state of affairs and in 1899 he moved to Fastiv.

He died at the age of 63 in Fastiv.

== M. M. Benardos Museum in Pereiaslav, Ukraine ==
The museum was established in Pereiaslav, Ukrainian SSR (modern Ukraine) in 1981 to commemorate 100 years after inventing the Elektrogefest. The museum consists of five rooms: a study, living room, workshop, laboratory and the exhibition hall.

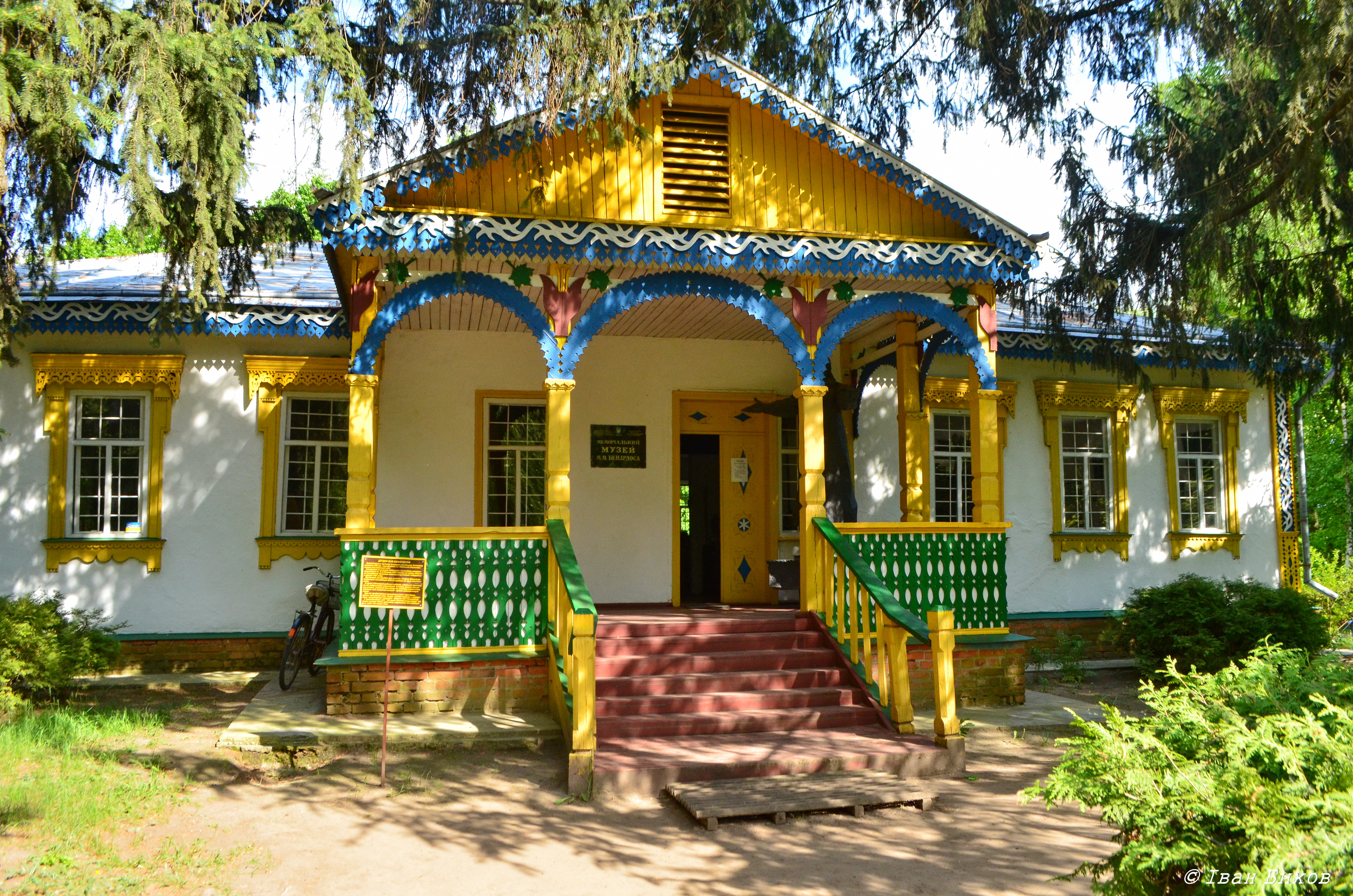
M. M. Benardos Museum in Pereiaslav

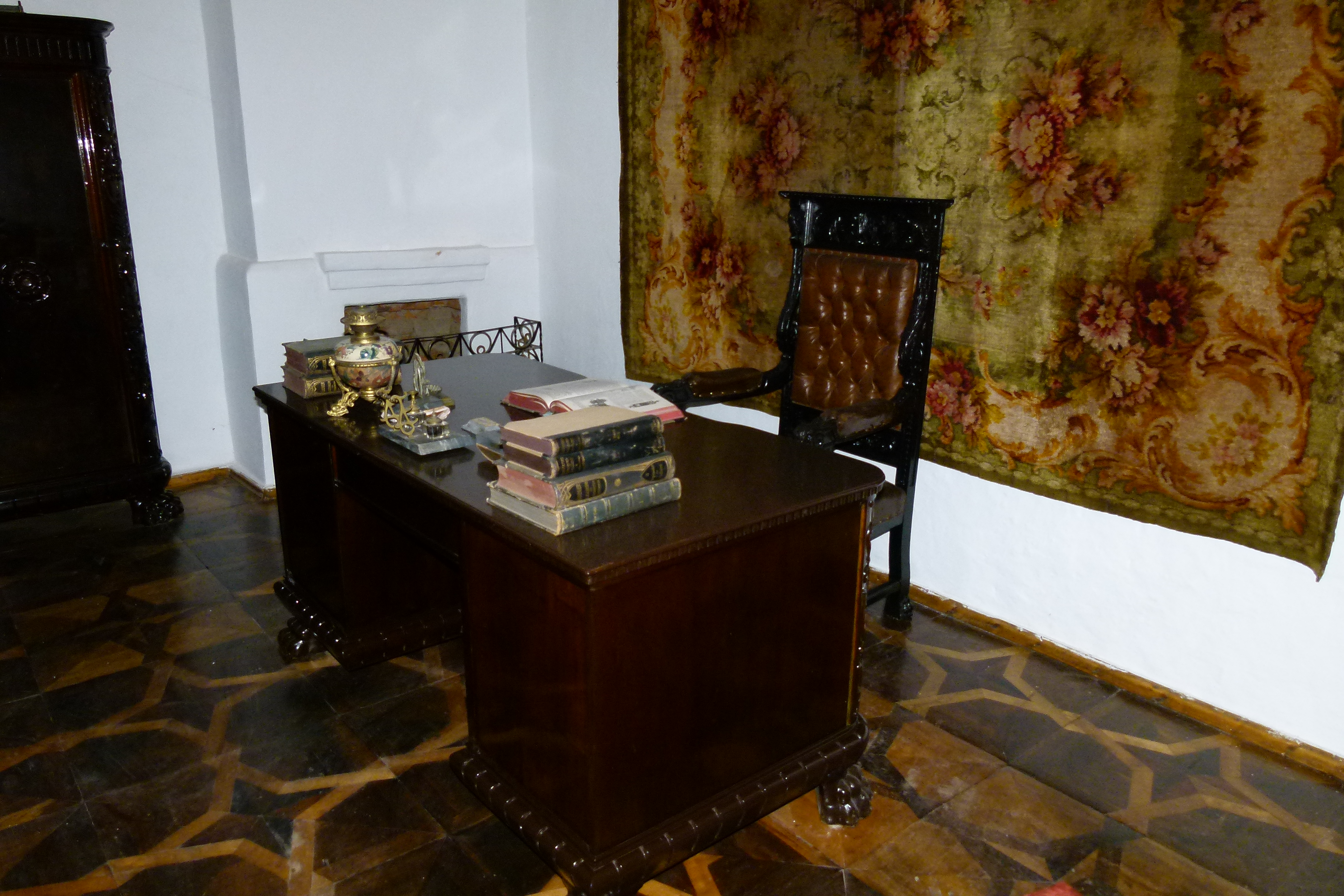
The study

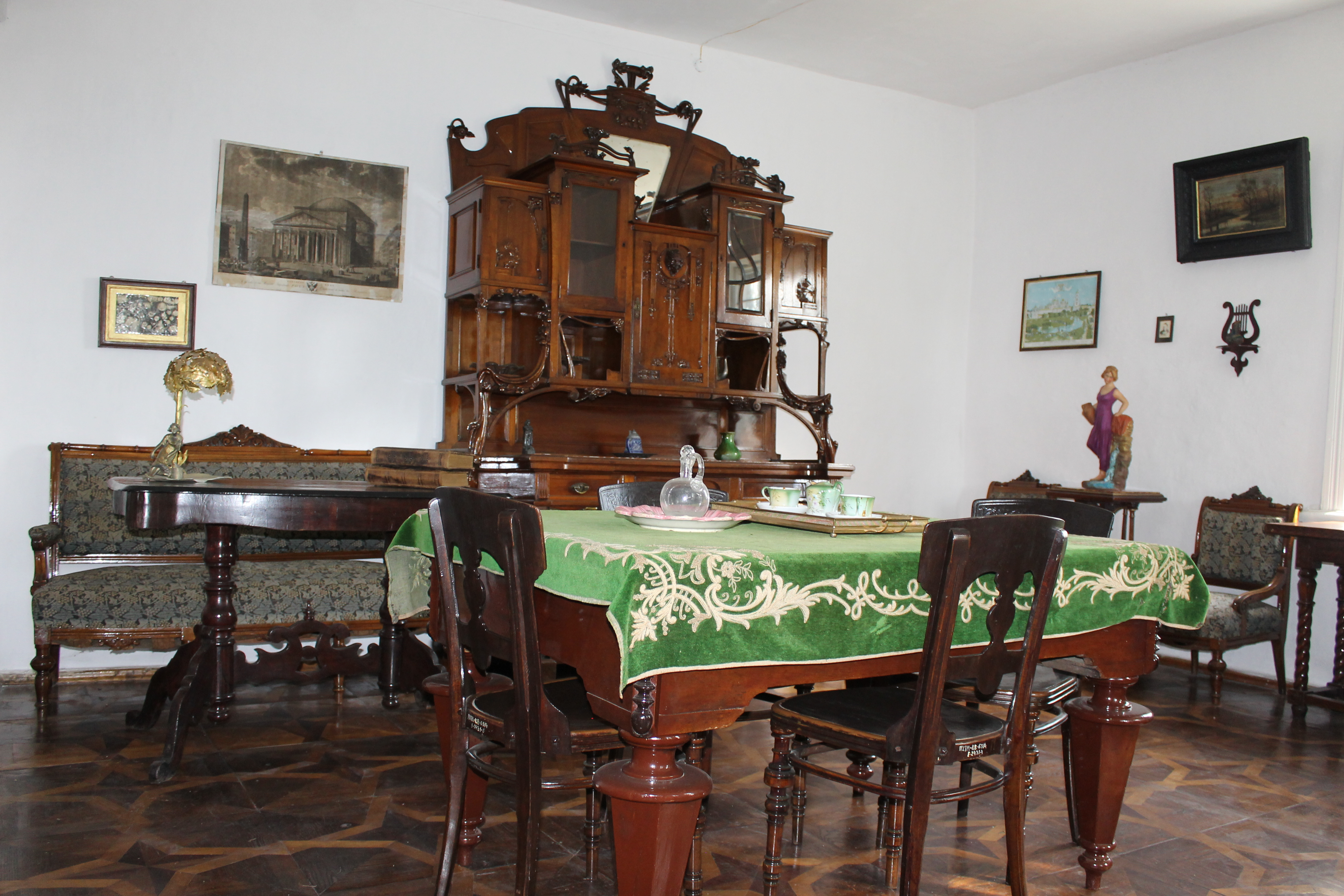
The living room

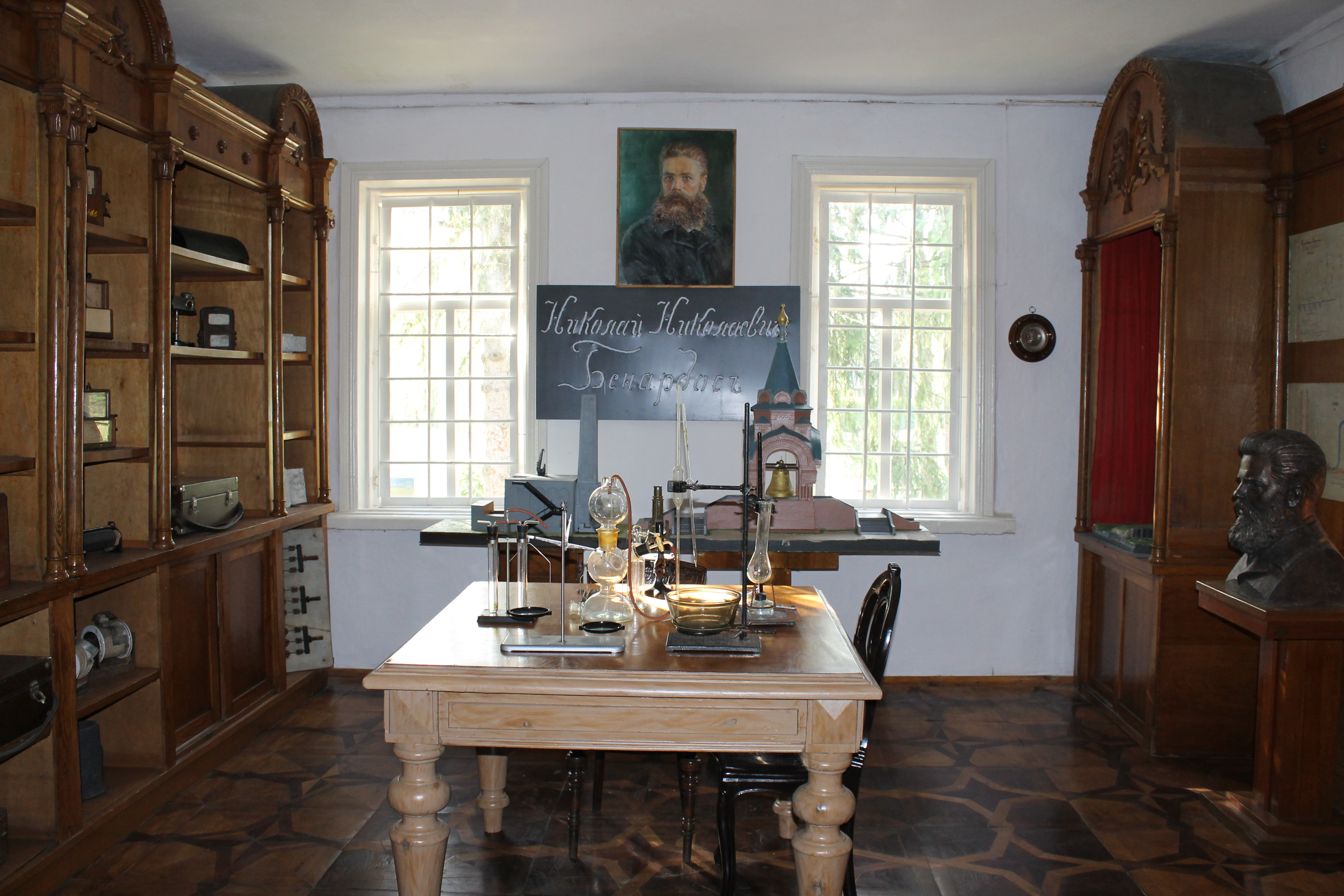
The laboratory
