= Carbon arc welding =

Arc welding process

Carbon arc welding (CAW) is an arc welding process which produces coalescence of metals by heating them with an arc between a non-consumable carbon (graphite) electrode and the work-piece. It was the first arc-welding process developed but is not used for many applications today, having been replaced by twin-carbon-arc welding and other variations. The purpose of arc welding is to form a bond between separate metal pieces. In carbon-arc welding a carbon electrode is used to produce an electric arc between the electrode and the materials being bonded. This arc produces temperatures in excess of 3,000 °C. At this temperature the separate metals form a bond and become welded together.

== Development ==
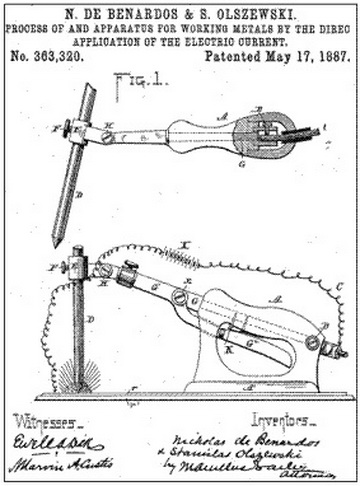
The patent for the arc welding method named Elektrogefest ("Electric Hephaestus") granted to Nicholas de Bernardos and Stanisław Olszewski in 1887

CAW could not have been created if not for the discovery of the electric arc by Humphry Davy in 1800, later repeated independently by a Russian physicist Vasily Vladimirovich Petrov in 1802. Petrov studied the electric arc and proposed its possible uses, including welding.

The inventors of carbon-arc welding were Nikolay Benardos and Stanisław Olszewski, who developed this method in 1881 and patented it later under the name Elektrogefest ("Electric Hephaestus").

== Variations ==
- Gas carbon arc welding (CAW-G) no longer has commercial significance. Other processes that use shielding gases have also replaced carbon-arc welding such as tungsten-arc welding (GTAW, or TIG), plasma-arc welding (PAW), and atomic-hydrogen welding (AHAW). Each of these processes, including carbon-arc welding, use a nonconsumable electrode. A filler metal is generally used to aid the bond in the workpieces.
- Shielded carbon arc welding (CAW-S)
- Twin carbon arc welding (CAW-T) in which the arc is established between two carbon electrodes

== See also ==
- Twin-carbon arc welding
