= Arc welding =

Welding process

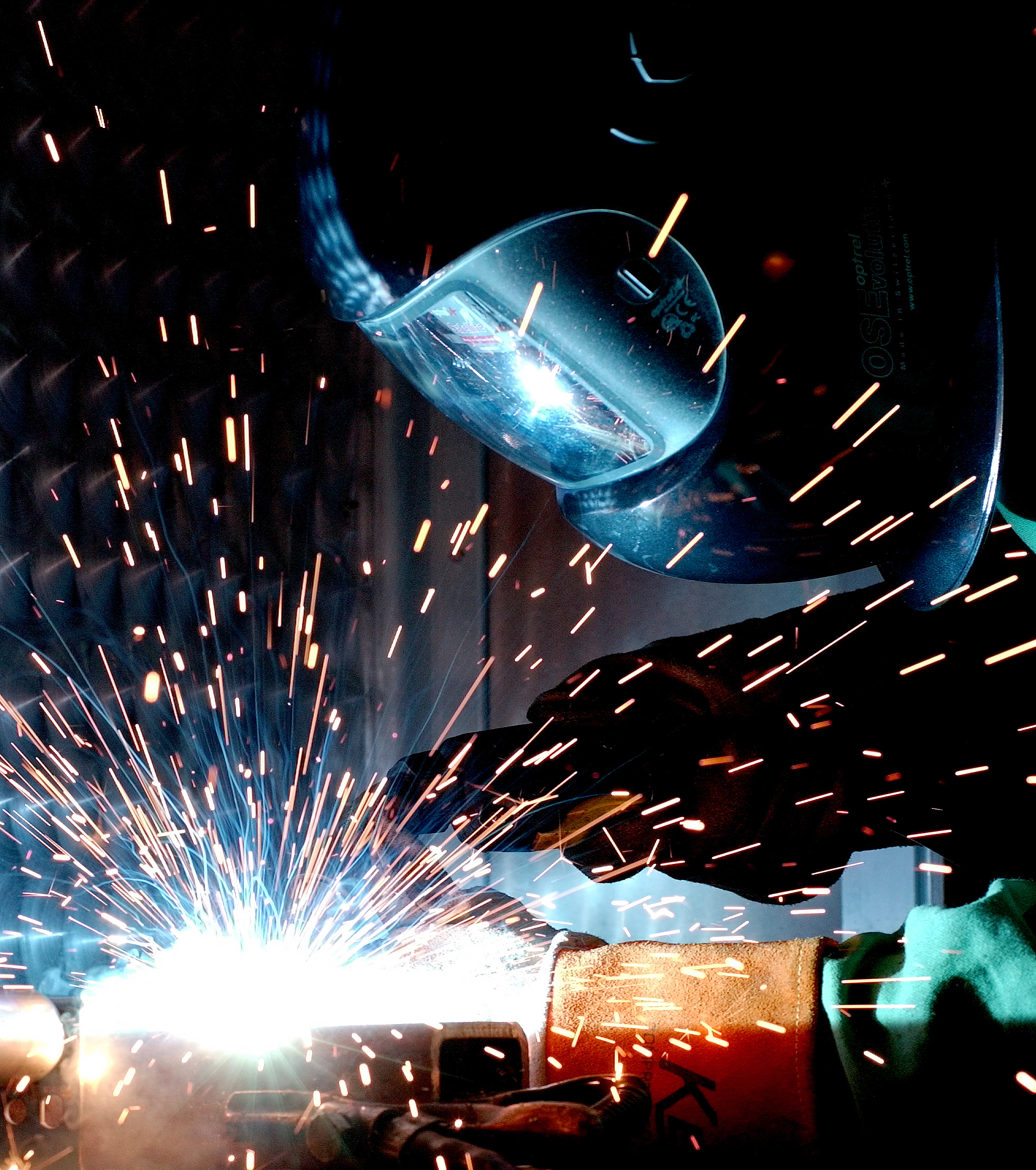
Gas metal arc welding

Man welding a metal structure in a newly constructed house in Bengaluru, India

Arc welding is a welding process that is used to join metal to metal by using electricity to create enough heat to melt metal, and the melted metals, when cool, result in a joining of the metals. It is a type of welding that uses a welding power supply to create an electric arc between a metal stick ("electrode") and the base material to melt the metals at the point of contact. Arc welding power supplies can deliver either direct (DC) or alternating (AC) current to the work, while consumable or non-consumable electrodes are used.

The welding area is usually protected by some type of shielding gas (e.g. an inert gas), vapor, or slag. Arc welding processes may be manual, semi-automatic, or fully automated. First developed in the late part of the 19th century, arc welding became commercially important in shipbuilding during the Second World War. Today it remains an important process for the fabrication of steel structures and vehicles.

== Power supplies ==
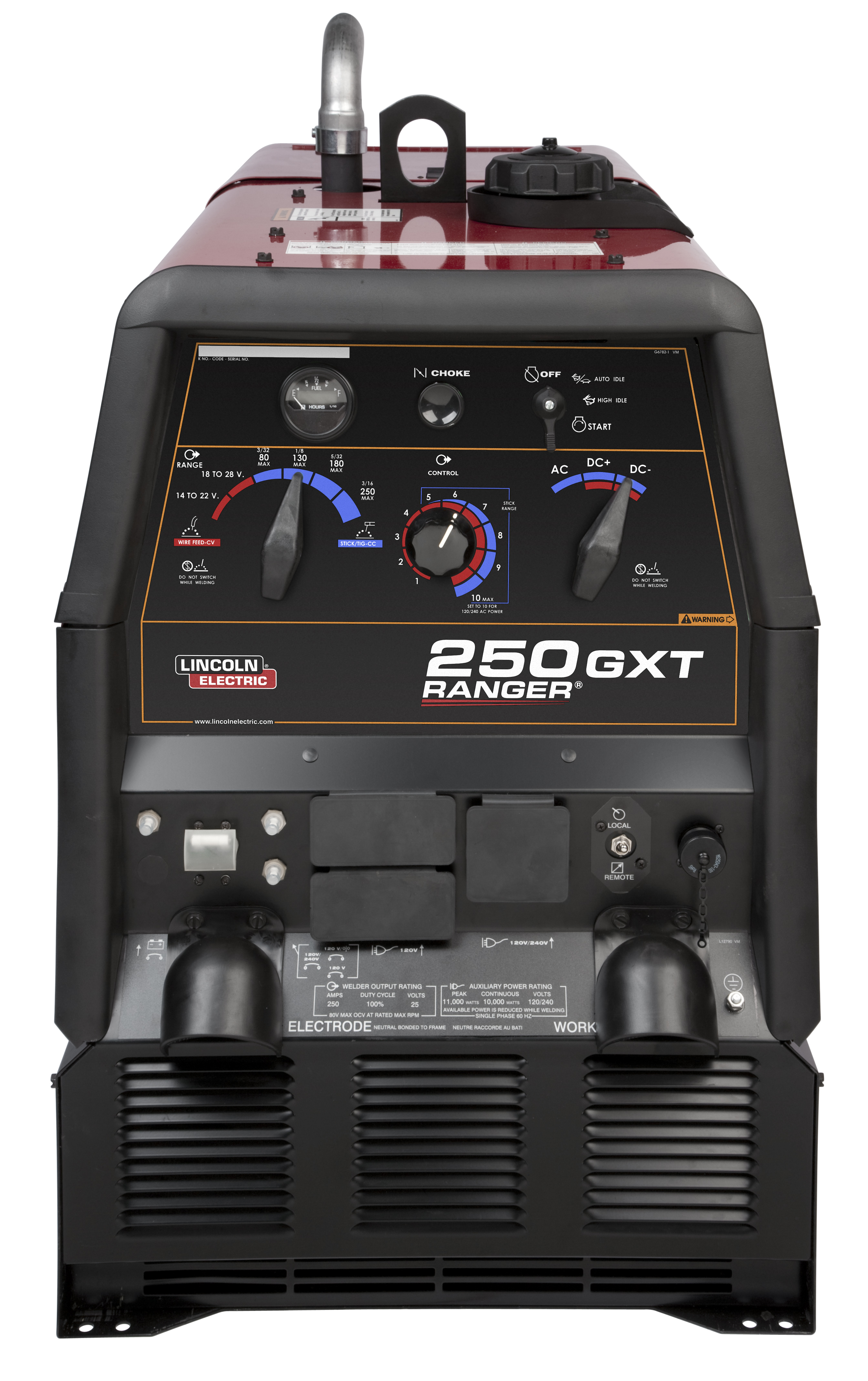
Engine driven welder capable of AC/DC welding

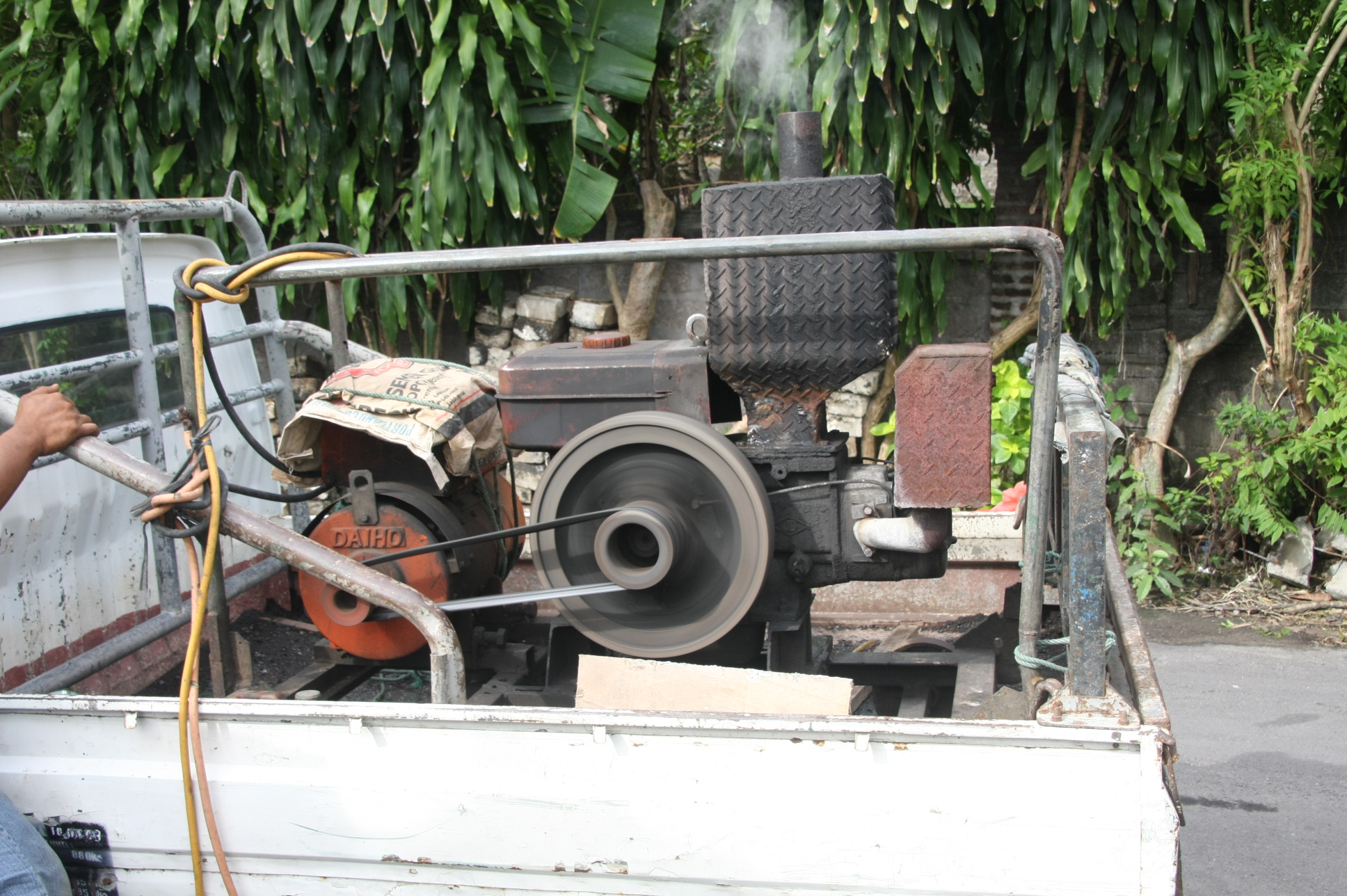
A diesel powered welding generator (the electric generator is on the left) as used in Indonesia

To supply the electrical energy necessary for arc welding processes, a number of different power supplies can be used. The most common classification is constant current power supplies and constant voltage power supplies. In arc welding, the voltage is directly related to the length of the arc, and the current is related to the amount of heat input. Constant current power supplies are most often used for manual welding processes such as gas tungsten arc welding and shielded metal arc welding, because they maintain a relatively constant current even as the voltage varies. This is important because in manual welding, it can be difficult to hold the electrode perfectly steady, and as a result, the arc length and thus voltage tend to fluctuate. Constant voltage power supplies hold the voltage constant and vary the current, and as a result, are most often used for automated welding processes such as gas metal arc welding, flux cored arc welding, and submerged arc welding. In these processes, arc length is kept constant, since any fluctuation in the distance between the wire and the base material is quickly rectified by a large change in current. For example, if the wire and the base material get too close, the current will rapidly increase, which in turn causes the heat to increase and the tip of the wire to melt, returning it to its original separation distance. Under normal arc length conditions, a constant current power supply with a stick electrode operates at about 20 volts.

The direction of current used in arc welding also plays an important role in welding. Consumable electrode processes such as shielded metal arc welding and gas metal arc welding generally use direct current, but the electrode can be charged either positively or negatively. In general, the positively charged anode will have a greater heat concentration (around 60%). "Note that for stick welding in general, DC+ polarity is most commonly used. It produces a good bead profile with a higher level of penetration. DC− polarity results in less penetration and a higher electrode melt-off rate. It is sometimes used, for example, on thin sheet metal in an attempt to prevent burn-through." "With few exceptions, electrode-positive (reversed polarity) results in deeper penetration. Electrode-negative (straight polarity) results in faster melt-off of the electrode and, therefore, faster deposition rate." Non-consumable electrode processes, such as gas tungsten arc welding, can use either type of direct current (DC), as well as alternating current (AC). With direct current however, because the electrode only creates the arc and does not provide filler material, a positively charged electrode causes shallow welds, while a negatively charged electrode makes deeper welds. Alternating current rapidly moves between these two, resulting in medium-penetration welds. One disadvantage of AC, the fact that the arc must be re-ignited after every zero crossing, has been addressed with the invention of special power units that produce a square wave pattern instead of the normal sine wave, eliminating low-voltage time after the zero crossings and minimizing the effects of the problem.

Duty cycle is a welding equipment specification which defines the number of minutes, within a 10-minute period, during which a given arc welder can safely be used. For example, an 80 A welder with a 60% duty cycle must be "rested" for at least 4 minutes after 6 minutes of continuous welding. Failure to observe duty cycle limitations could damage the welder. Commercial- or professional-grade welders typically have a 100% duty cycle.

== Consumable electrode methods ==
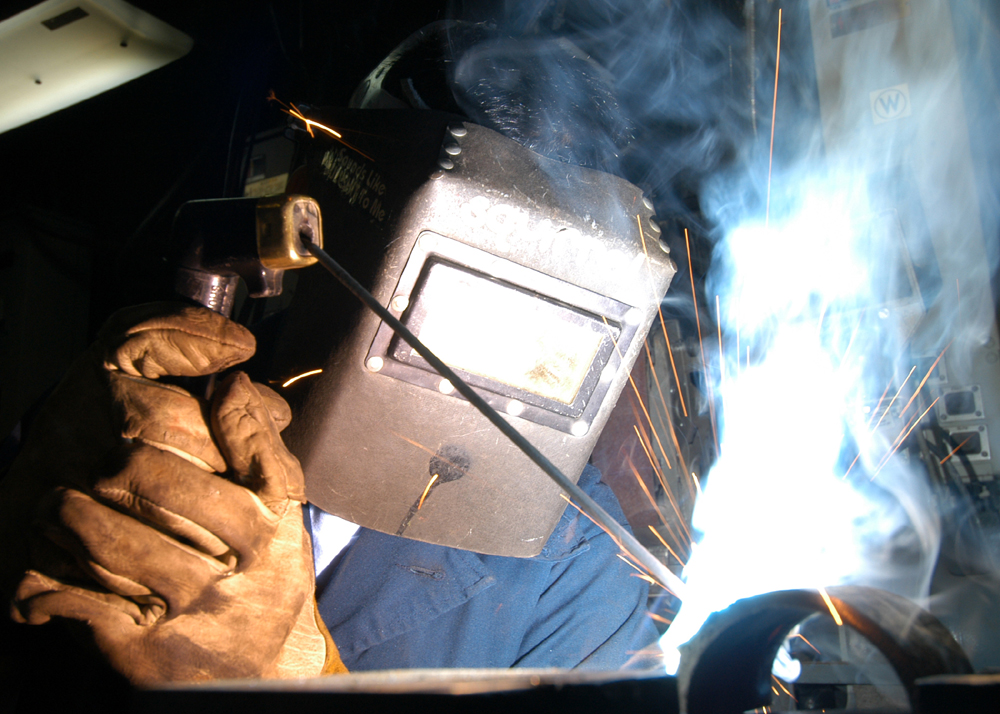
Shielded metal arc welding

One of the most common types of arc welding is shielded metal arc welding (SMAW), which is also known as manual metal arc welding (MMAW) or stick welding. An electric current is used to strike an arc between the base material and a consumable electrode rod or stick. The electrode rod is made of a material that is compatible with the base material being welded and is covered with a flux that gives off vapors that serve as a shielding gas and provide a layer of slag, both of which protect the weld area from atmospheric contamination. The electrode core itself acts as filler material, making a separate filler unnecessary. The process is very versatile, requiring little operator training and inexpensive equipment. However, weld times are rather slow, since the consumable electrodes must be frequently replaced and because slag, the residue from the flux, must be chipped away after welding. Furthermore, the process is generally limited to welding ferrous materials, though specialty electrodes have made possible the welding of cast iron, nickel, aluminum, copper and other metals. The versatility of the method makes it popular in a number of applications including repair work and construction.

Gas metal arc welding (GMAW), commonly called MIG (for metal/inert-gas), is a semi-automatic or automatic welding process with a continuously fed consumable wire acting as both electrode and filler metal, along with an inert or semi-inert shielding gas flowed around the wire to protect the weld site from contamination. Constant voltage, direct current power source is most commonly used with GMAW, but constant current alternating current are used as well. With continuously fed filler electrodes, GMAW offers relatively high welding speeds; however the more complicated equipment reduces convenience and versatility in comparison to the SMAW process. Originally developed for welding aluminum and other non-ferrous materials in the 1940s, GMAW was soon economically applied to steels. Today, GMAW is commonly used in industries such as the automobile industry for its quality, versatility and speed. Because of the need to maintain a stable shroud of shielding gas around the weld site, it can be problematic to use the GMAW process in areas of high air movement such as outdoors.

Flux-cored arc welding (FCAW) is a variation of the GMAW technique. FCAW wire is actually a fine metal tube filled with powdered flux materials. An externally supplied shielding gas is sometimes used, but often the flux itself is relied upon to generate the necessary protection from the atmosphere. The process is widely used in construction because of its high welding speed and portability.

Submerged arc welding (SAW) is a high-productivity welding process in which the arc is struck beneath a covering layer of granular flux. This increases arc quality, since contaminants in the atmosphere are blocked by the flux. The slag that forms on the weld generally comes off by itself and, combined with the use of a continuous wire feed, the weld deposition rate is high. Working conditions are much improved over other arc welding processes since the flux hides the arc and no smoke is produced. The process is commonly used in industry, especially for large products. As the arc is not visible, it is typically automated. SAW is only possible in the 1F (flat fillet), 2F (horizontal fillet), and 1G (flat groove) positions.

== Non-consumable electrode methods ==
Gas tungsten arc welding (GTAW), or tungsten/inert-gas (TIG) welding, is a manual welding process that uses a non-consumable electrode made of tungsten, an inert or semi-inert gas mixture, and a separate filler material. Especially useful for welding thin materials, this method is characterized by a stable arc and high quality welds, but it requires significant operator skill and can only be accomplished at relatively low speeds. It can be used on nearly all weldable metals, though it is most often applied to stainless steel and light metals. It is often used when quality welds are extremely important, such as in bicycle, aircraft and marine applications.

A related process, plasma arc welding, also uses a tungsten electrode but uses plasma gas to make the arc. The arc is more concentrated than the GTAW arc, making transverse control more critical and thus generally restricting the technique to a mechanized process. Because of its stable current, the method can be used on a wider range of material thicknesses than can the GTAW process and is much faster. It can be applied to all of the same materials as GTAW except magnesium; automated welding of stainless steel is one important application of the process. A variation of the process is plasma cutting, an efficient steel cutting process.

Other arc welding processes include atomic hydrogen welding, carbon arc welding, electroslag welding, electrogas welding, and stud arc welding.

== Corrosion issues ==
Some materials, notably high-strength steels, aluminum, and titanium alloys, are susceptible to hydrogen embrittlement. If the electrodes used for welding contain traces of moisture, the water decomposes in the heat of the arc and the liberated hydrogen enters the lattice of the material, causing its brittleness. Stick electrodes for such materials, with special low-hydrogen coating, are delivered in sealed moisture-proof packaging. New electrodes can be used straight from the can, but when moisture absorption may be suspected, they have to be dried by baking (usually at 450 to 550 °C or 840 to 1,020 °F) in a drying oven. Flux used has to be kept dry as well.

Some austenitic stainless steels and nickel-based alloys are prone to intergranular corrosion. When subjected to temperatures around 700 °C (1,300 °F) for too long a time, chromium reacts with carbon in the material, forming chromium carbide and depleting the crystal edges of chromium, impairing their corrosion resistance in a process called sensitization. Such sensitized steel undergoes corrosion in the areas near the welds where the temperature-time was favorable for forming the carbide. This kind of corrosion is often termed weld decay.

Knifeline attack (KLA) is another kind of corrosion affecting welds, impacting steels stabilized by niobium. Niobium and niobium carbide dissolves in steel at very high temperatures. At some cooling regimes, niobium carbide does not precipitate, and the steel then behaves like unstabilized steel, forming chromium carbide instead. This affects only a thin zone several millimeters wide in the very vicinity of the weld, making it difficult to spot and increasing the corrosion speed. Structures made of such steels have to be heated in a whole to about 1,000 °C (1,830 °F), when the chromium carbide dissolves and niobium carbide forms. The cooling rate after this treatment is not important.

Filler metal (electrode material) improperly chosen for the environmental conditions can make them corrosion-sensitive as well. There are also issues of galvanic corrosion if the electrode composition is sufficiently dissimilar to the materials welded, or the materials are dissimilar themselves. Even between different grades of nickel-based stainless steels, corrosion of welded joints can be severe, despite that they rarely undergo galvanic corrosion when mechanically joined.

== Safety issues ==
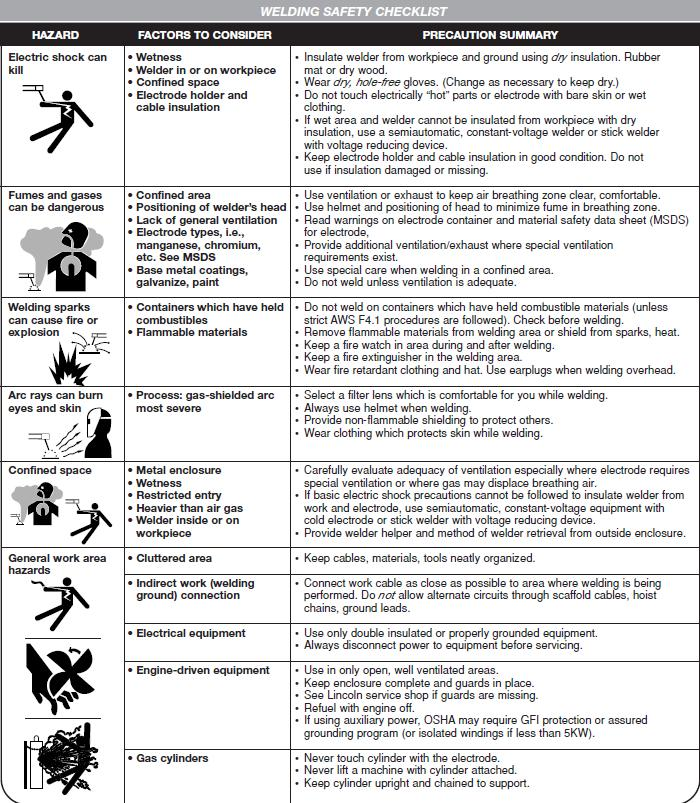
Welding safety checklist

Welding can be a dangerous and unhealthy practice without the proper precautions; however, with the use of new technology and proper protection the risks of injury or death associated with welding can be greatly reduced.

=== Heat, fire, and explosion hazard ===
Because many common welding procedures involve an open electric arc or flame, the risk of burns from heat and sparks is significant. To prevent them, welders wear protective clothing in the form of heavy leather gloves and protective long sleeve jackets to avoid exposure to extreme heat, flames, and sparks. The use of compressed gases and flames in many welding processes also pose an explosion and fire risk; some common precautions include limiting the amount of oxygen in the air and keeping combustible materials away from the workplace.

=== Eye damage ===
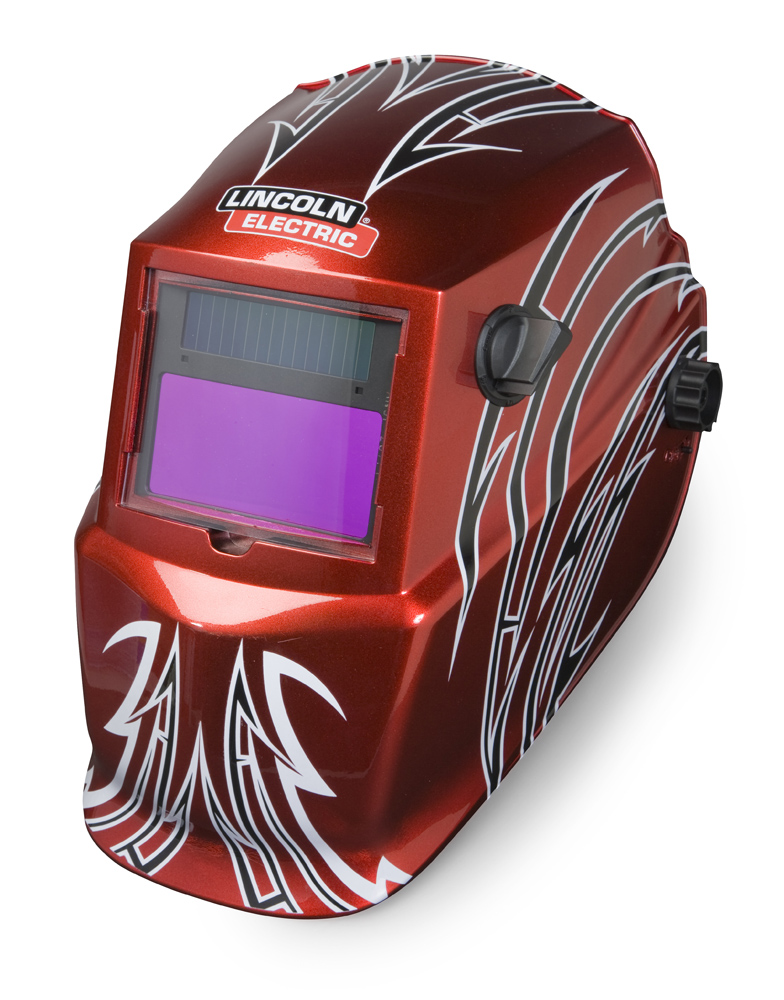
Auto darkening welding hood with 90 × 110 mm cartridge and 3.78 × 1.85 in viewing area

Exposure to the brightness of the weld area leads to a condition called arc eye in which ultraviolet light causes inflammation of the cornea and can burn the retinas of the eyes. Welding goggles and helmets with dark face plates—much darker than those in sunglasses or oxy-fuel goggles—are worn to prevent this exposure. In recent years, new helmet models have been produced featuring a face plate which automatically self-darkens electronically. To protect bystanders, transparent welding curtains often surround the welding area. These curtains, made of a polyvinyl chloride plastic film, shield nearby workers from exposure to the UV light from the electric arc.

=== Inhaled matter ===
Welders are also often exposed to dangerous gases and particulate matter. Processes like flux-cored arc welding and shielded metal arc welding produce smoke containing particles of various types of oxides. The size of the particles in question tends to influence the toxicity of the fumes, with smaller particles presenting a greater danger. Additionally, many processes produce various gases (most commonly carbon dioxide and ozone, but others as well) that can prove dangerous if ventilation is inadequate.

=== Electrical safety ===
While the open-circuit voltage of an arc welding machine may be only a few tens of volts up to about 120 volts, even these low voltages can present a hazard of electric shock for the operators. Locations such as ship's hulls, storage tanks, metal structural steel, or in wet areas are usually at earth ground potential and operators may be standing or resting on these surfaces during operating of the electric arc. Welding machines operating off AC power distribution systems must isolate the arc circuit from earth ground to prevent insulation faults in the machine from exposing operators to high voltage. The return clamp of the welding machine is located near to the work area, to reduce the risk of stray current traveling a long way to create heating hazards or electric shock exposure, or to cause damage to sensitive electronic devices. Welding operators are careful to install return clamps so that welding current cannot pass through the bearings of electric motors, conveyor rollers, or other rotating components, which would cause damage to bearings. Welding on electrical buswork connected to transformers presents a danger of the low welding voltage being "stepped up" to much higher voltages, so extra grounding cables may be required.

=== Interference with pacemakers ===
Certain welding machines which use a high frequency alternating current component have been found to affect pacemaker operation when within 2 meters of the power unit and 1 meter of the weld site.

== History ==
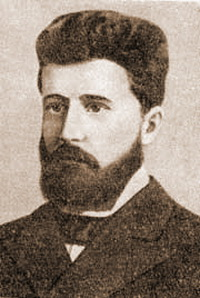
Nikolay Benardos

While examples of forge welding go back to the Bronze Age and the Iron Age, arc welding did not come into practice until much later.

In 1800, Humphry Davy discovered the short pulsed electric arcs. Arc welding was first developed when Nikolay Benardos presented arc welding of metals using a carbon electrode at the International Exposition of Electricity, Paris in 1881, which was patented together with Stanisław Olszewski in 1887. In the same year, French electrical inventor Auguste de Méritens also invented a carbon arc welding method, patented in 1881, which was successfully used for welding lead in the manufacture of lead–acid batteries. The advances in arc welding continued with the invention of metal electrodes in the late 19th century by a Russian, Nikolai Slavyanov (1888), and an American, C. L. Coffin. Around 1900, A. P. Strohmenger released in Britain a coated metal electrode which gave a more stable arc. Oscar Kjellberg further refined the process for stick electrode welding in 1904. In 1905, Russian scientist Vladimir Mitkevich proposed the usage of three-phase electric arc for welding. In 1919, alternating current welding was invented by C. J. Holslag but did not become popular for another decade.

Competing welding processes such as resistance welding and oxyfuel welding were developed during this time as well; but both, especially the latter, faced stiff competition from arc welding especially after metal coverings (known as flux) for the electrode, to stabilize the arc and shield the base material from impurities, continued to be developed.

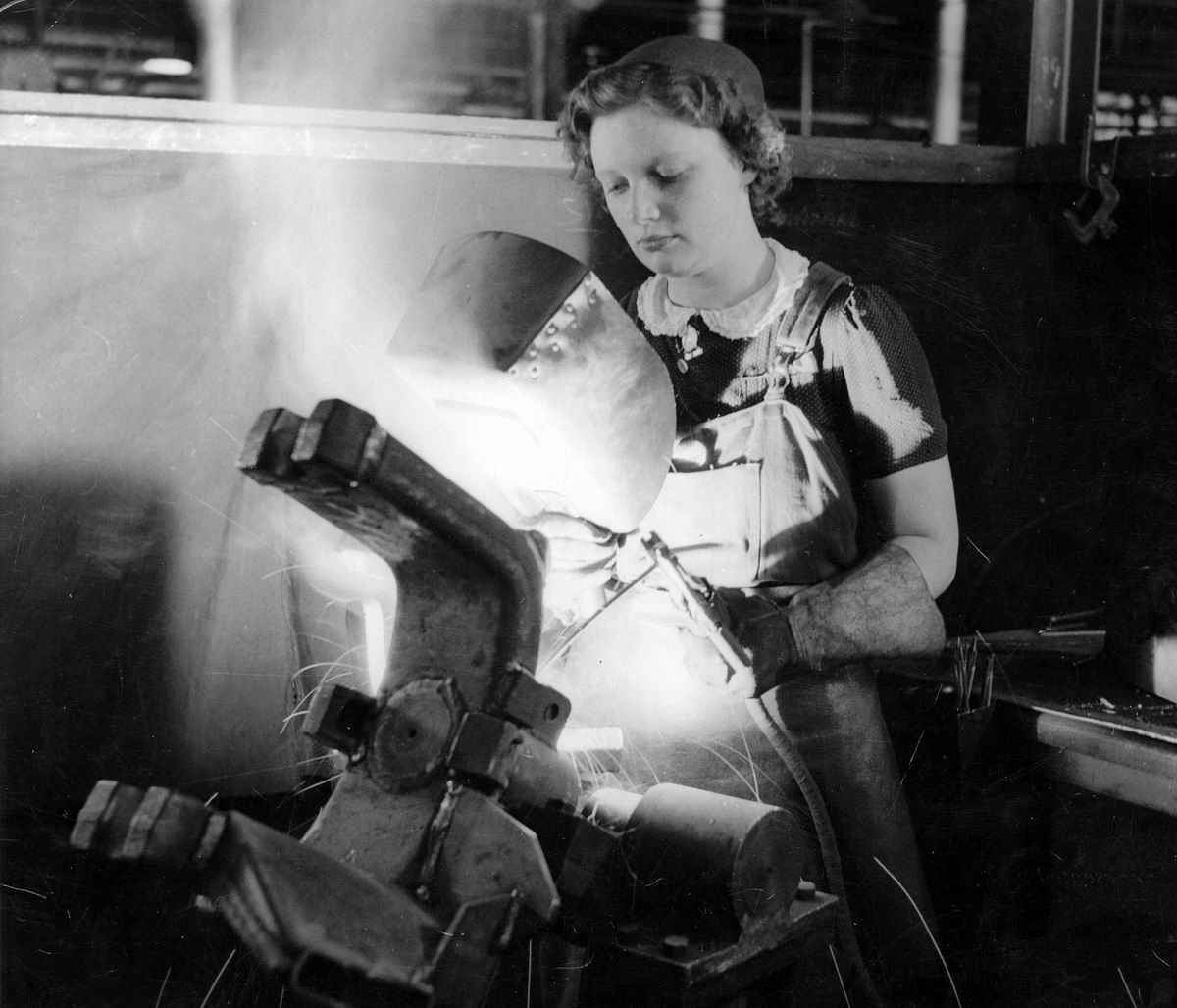
A young woman arc welding in a munitions factory in Australia in 1943

During World War I, welding started to be used in shipbuilding in Great Britain in place of riveted steel plates. The Americans also became more accepting of the new technology when the process allowed them to repair their ships quickly after a German attack in the New York Harbor at the beginning of the war. Arc welding was first applied to aircraft during the war as well, and some German airplane fuselages were constructed using this process. In 1919, the British shipbuilder Cammell Laird started construction of a merchant ship, the Fullagar, with an entirely welded hull; she was launched in 1921.

During the 1920s, major advances were made in welding technology, including the 1920 introduction of automatic welding in which electrode wire was continuously fed. Shielding gas became a subject receiving much attention as scientists attempted to protect welds from the effects of oxygen and nitrogen in the atmosphere. Porosity and brittleness were the primary problems and the solutions that developed included the use of hydrogen, argon, and helium as welding atmospheres. During the following decade, further advances allowed for the welding of reactive metals such as aluminum and magnesium. This, in conjunction with developments in automatic welding, alternating current, and fluxes fed a major expansion of arc welding during the 1930s and then during World War II.

During the middle of the century, many new welding methods were invented. Submerged arc welding was invented in 1930 and continues to be popular today. In 1932, a Russian, Konstantin Khrenov successfully implemented the first underwater electric arc welding. Gas tungsten arc welding, after decades of development, was finally perfected in 1941 and gas metal arc welding followed in 1948, allowing for fast welding of non-ferrous materials but requiring expensive shielding gases. Using a consumable electrode and a carbon dioxide atmosphere as a shielding gas, it quickly became the most popular metal arc welding process. In 1957, the flux-cored arc welding process debuted in which the self-shielded wire electrode could be used with automatic equipment, resulting in greatly increased welding speeds. In that same year, plasma arc welding was invented. Electroslag welding was released in 1958 and was followed by its cousin, electrogas welding, in 1961.

== See also ==
- List of welding processes
- Gas metal arc ("MIG"/"MAG") welding
- Oxy-fuel welding
- Tungsten inert gas ("TIG") welding
- Robot welding – Use of programmable tools for welding
- Sensors for arc welding
- Weld quality assurance
