= Hyperbaric welding =

Welding metal at elevated pressure

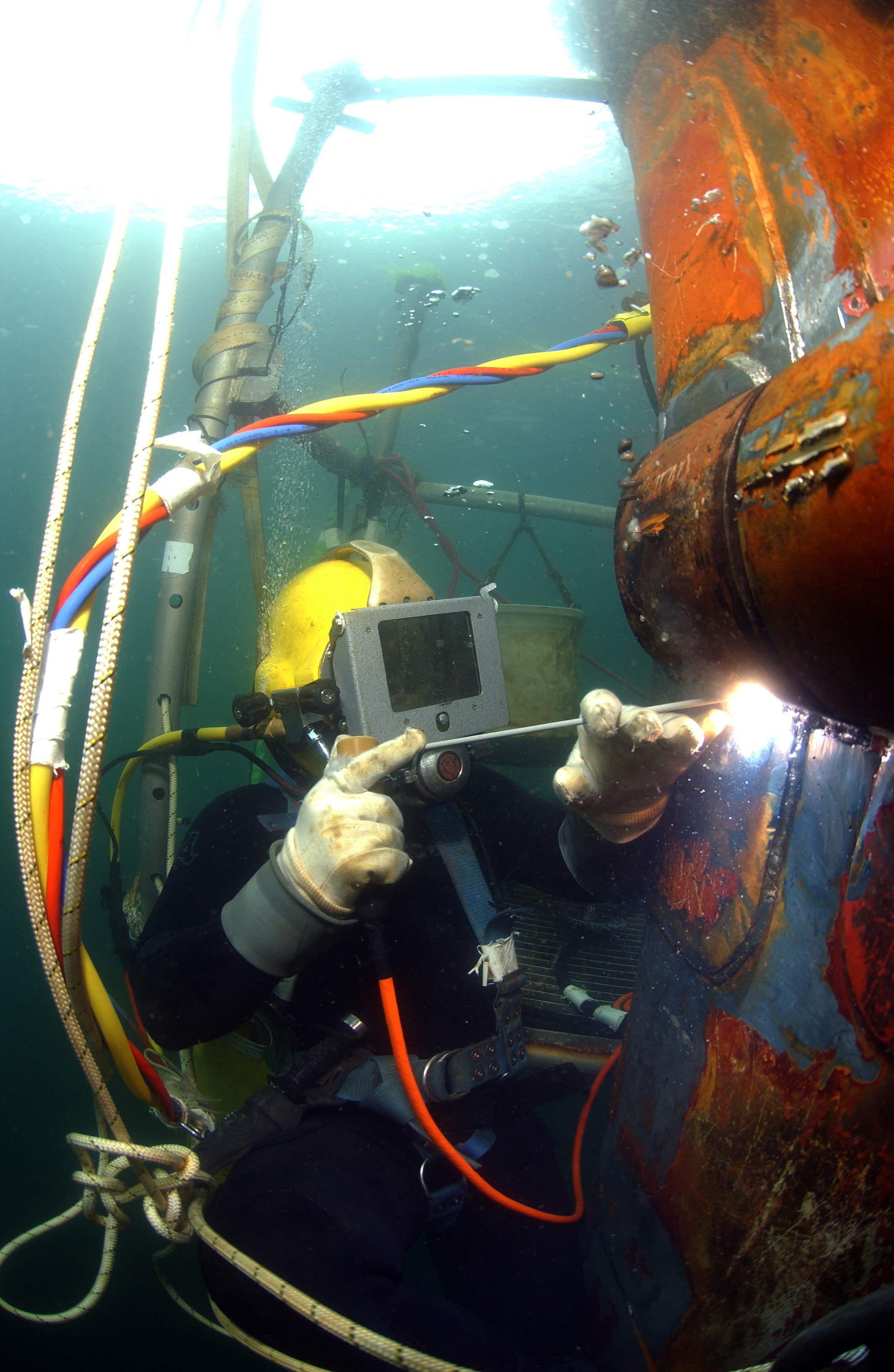
Underwater welding

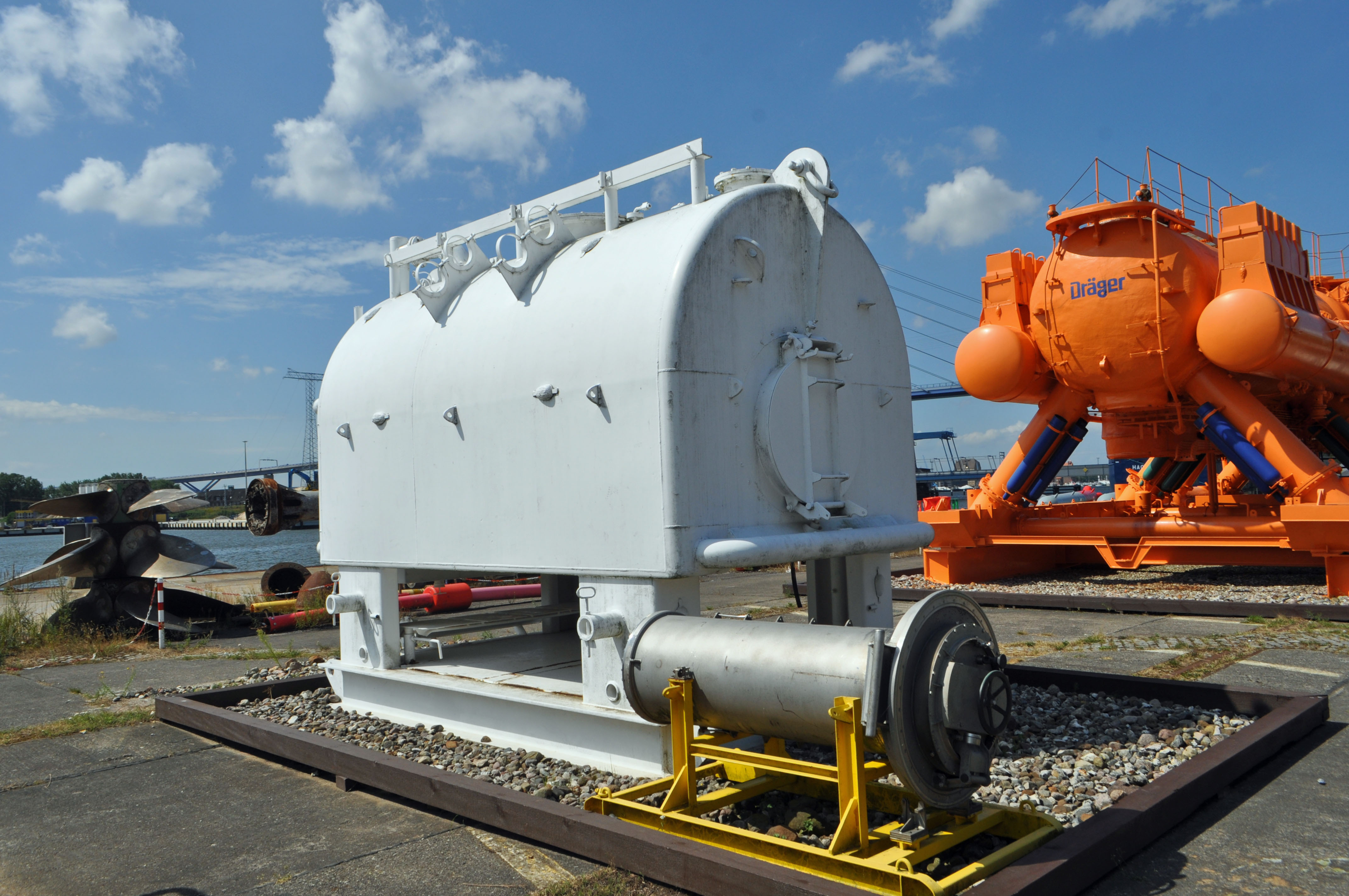
Underwater welding habitat for dry hyperbaric welding

Hyperbaric welding is the process of extreme welding at elevated pressures, normally underwater. Hyperbaric welding can either take place wet in the water itself or dry inside a specially constructed positive pressure enclosure and hence a dry environment. It is predominantly referred to as "hyperbaric welding" when used in a dry environment, and "underwater welding" when in a wet environment. The applications of hyperbaric welding are diverse—it is often used to repair ships, offshore oil platforms, and pipelines. Steel is the most common material welded.

Dry welding is used in preference to wet underwater welding when high quality welds are required because of the increased control over conditions which can be maintained, such as through application of prior and post weld heat treatments. This improved environmental control leads directly to improved process performance and a generally much higher quality weld than a comparative wet weld. Thus, when a very high quality weld is required, dry hyperbaric welding is normally utilized. Research into using dry hyperbaric welding at depths of up to 1,000 metres (3,300 ft) is ongoing. In general, assuring the integrity of underwater welds can be difficult (but is possible using various nondestructive testing applications), especially for wet underwater welds, because defects are difficult to detect if the defects are beneath the surface of the weld.

Underwater hyperbaric welding was invented by the Soviet metallurgist Konstantin Khrenov in 1932.

== Application ==
Welding processes have become increasingly important in almost all manufacturing industries and for structural applications (metal skeletons of buildings). Of the many techniques for welding in atmosphere, most cannot be applied in offshore and marine applications in contact with water. Most offshore repair and surfacing work is done at shallow depth or in the region intermittently covered by water (the splash zone). However, the most technologically challenging task is repair at greater depths, especially for pipeline construction and the repair of tears and breaks in marine structures and vessels. Underwater welding can be the least expensive option for marine maintenance and repair, because it bypasses the need to pull the structure out of the sea and saves valuable time and dry docking costs. It also enables emergency repairs to allow the damaged structure to be safely transported to dry facilities for permanent repair or scrapping. Underwater welding is applied in both inland and offshore environments, though seasonal weather inhibits offshore underwater welding during winter. In either location, surface supplied air is the most common diving method for underwater welders.

== Dry welding ==
Dry hyperbaric welding involves the weld being performed at raised pressure in a chamber filled with a gas mixture sealed around the structure being welded.

Most arc welding processes such as shielded metal arc welding (SMAW), flux-cored arc welding (FCAW), gas tungsten arc welding (GTAW), gas metal arc welding (GMAW), plasma arc welding (PAW) could be operated at hyperbaric pressures, but all suffer as the pressure increases. Gas tungsten arc welding is most commonly used. The degradation is associated with physical changes of the arc behaviour as the gas flow regime around the arc changes and the arc roots contract and become more mobile. Of note is a dramatic increase in arc voltage which is associated with the increase in pressure. Overall a degradation in capability and efficiency results as the pressure increases.

Special control techniques have been applied which have allowed welding down to 2,500 m (8,200 ft) simulated water depth in the laboratory, but dry hyperbaric welding has thus far been limited operationally to less than 400 m (1,300 ft) water depth by the physiological capability of divers to operate the welding equipment at high pressures and practical considerations concerning construction of an automated pressure / welding chamber at depth.

== Wet welding ==
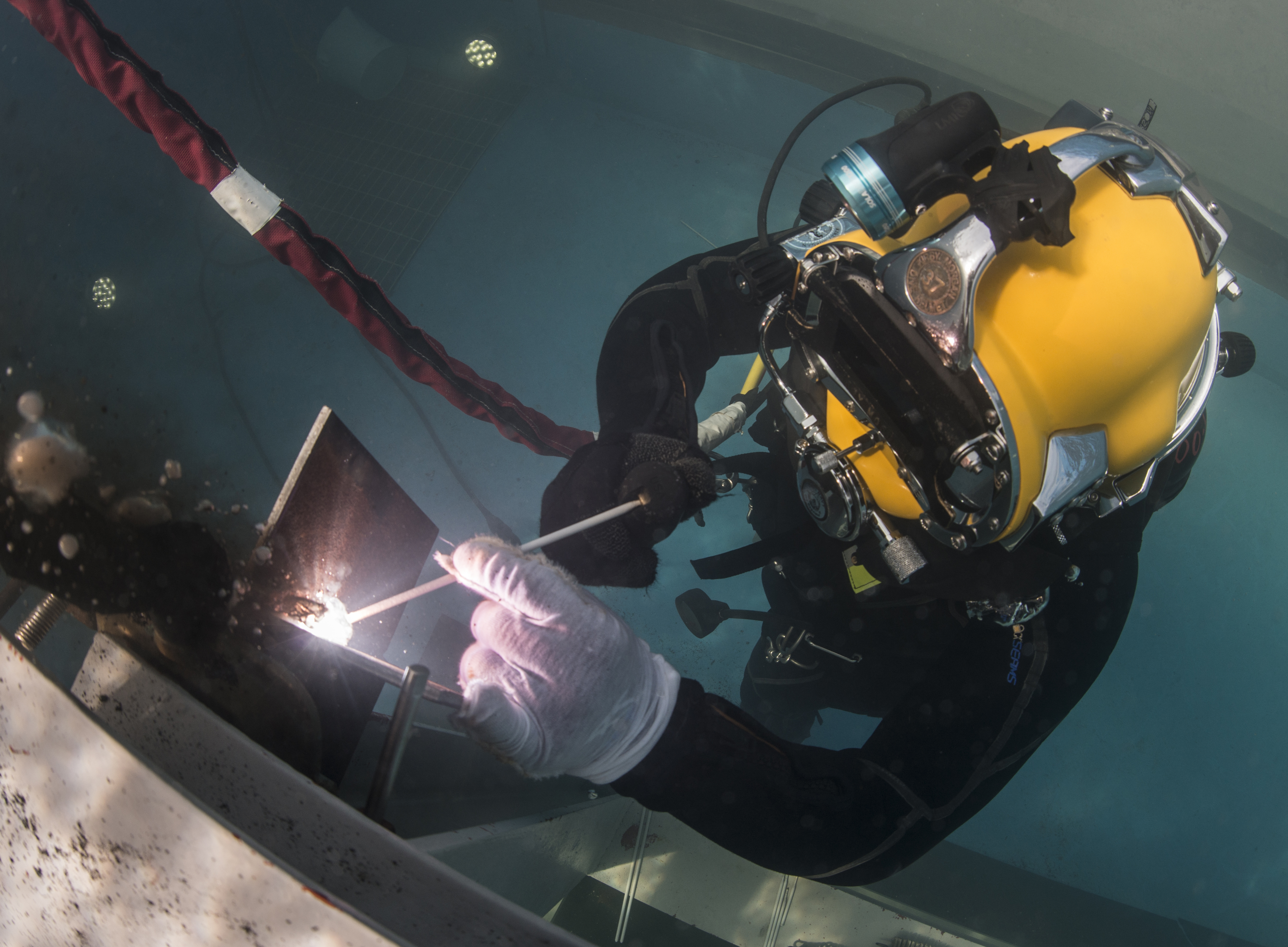
A diver practices underwater welding in a training pool

Underwater welding directly exposes the diver and electrode to the water and surrounding elements. Divers usually use around 300–400 amps of direct current to power their electrode, and they weld using varied forms of arc welding. This practice commonly uses a variation of shielded metal arc welding, which uses an electrode that is waterproof. Other processes that are used include flux-cored arc welding and friction welding. In each of these cases, the welding power supply is connected to the welding equipment through cables and hoses. The process is generally limited to low carbon equivalent steels, especially at greater depths, because of hydrogen-caused cracking.

Wet welding with a stick electrode is done with similar equipment to that used for dry welding, but the electrode holders are designed for water cooling and are more heavily insulated. They will overheat if used out of the water. A constant current welding machine is used for manual metal arc welding. Direct current is used, and a heavy duty isolation switch is installed in the welding cable at the surface control position, so that the welding current can be disconnected when not in use. The welder instructs the surface operator to make and break the contact as required during the procedure. The contacts should only be closed during actual welding, and opened at other times, particularly when changing electrodes.

The electric arc heats the workpiece and the welding rod, and the molten metal is transferred through the gas bubble around the arc. The gas bubble is partly formed from decomposition of the flux coating on the electrode but it is usually contaminated to some extent by steam. Current flow induces transfer of metal droplets from the electrode to the workpiece and enables positional welding by a skilled operator. Slag deposition on the weld surface helps to slow the rate of cooling, but rapid cooling is one of the biggest problems in producing a quality weld.

== Hazards and risks ==
The hazards of underwater welding include the risk of electric shock for the welder. To prevent this, the welding equipment must be adaptable to a marine environment, properly insulated and the welding current must be controlled. Commercial divers must also consider the occupational safety issues that divers face, most notably the risk of decompression sickness due to the increased pressure of breathing gases. Many divers have reported a metallic taste that is related to the galvanic breakdown of dental amalgam. There may also be long term cognitive and possibly musculoskeletal effects associated with underwater welding.

== See also ==
- Oxy-fuel welding and cutting – Metalworking technique using a fuel and oxygen
