= Orbital welding =

Specialized area of welding

Orbital welding is a specialized area of arc welding whereby the arc is rotated mechanically through 360° (180° in double up welding) around a static workpiece, such as a pipe, in a continuous process. This method and technology was developed to address the issue of operator error in manual gas tungsten arc welding (GTAW) applications requiring precision tube and pipe welding. To ensure high-quality repeatable welds a more stringent weld criteria was set by the ASME.

In orbital welding, an automated computer-controlled process runs with little intervention from the operator.

== History ==
Rodrick Rohrberg of North American Aviation invented the orbital welding process to address fuel and hydraulic fluids leaking in and around the plumbing of the X-15 Rocket Research plane.

== Equipment ==
The main components of the typical orbital welding system are the power supply with integrated computer control, the welding head, and either a wire feed mechanism or a presharpened tungsten electrode. Welding of certain sizes and material types will also require a water/coolant system. There are a large number of factors that influence the welding result. These aspects include the arc length, magnitude, and pulse frequency of the welding current, welding speed, inert shielding gas, parent material, filler material, weld preparation, and thermal conductivity. Ultimately, a high-quality weld is achieved through detailed knowledge of how to precisely adjust all these parameters for each individual welding task.

== Application ==
=== The welding process ===
It is very difficult to achieve the highest standards of quality and safety using manual welding. This is due to certain welding positions, overhead and down-hand welds for example, often leading to faulty welds due to restricted access the user has in these welding positions. In order to have complete control over the weld pool, a perfect balance must be maintained between gravitational force and surface tension at every position of the torch. By using mechanised variants of the technique, certain parts of the welding process are handled by mechanical components. Note that a welding operator is always monitoring and controlling the process. In an ideal situation, all welding parameters would be fully programmed before welding is started. In practice, however, the presence of variable constraints means that it is often necessary for the welder to make corrective interventions and create custom programs for the application.

Orbital tube welding can use open weld heads and enclosed weld heads. Each style of weld head uses the fusion process described in ASME Section IX. No filler metal is added.

A successful orbital weld is 100% automatic and repeatable as long as the operator monitors variables and performs periodic inspections of the weld seam for complete penetration of the weld. Noticing that a variable has changed during the welding process is a necessary skill for orbital welding technicians and operators that can be easily missed. Training and experience are required for an operator to be successful at consistently producing acceptable, repeatable, high-precision welds that meet today's standards.

Several critical variables can affect the success of an orbital weld. These include using the proper weld program in the orbital welding power supply or controller to match the settings to the pipe size, wall thickness, and tube material. Other key factors include the pipe preparation and face, the correct positioning of the weld head on the tube, and the amount of oxygen present during the welding process.

Maintenance of the weld head often becomes a factor in the repeatability of successful welds. Weld head internals can become charred from improper use. The charring is carbon deposits that can conduct electricity and short-circuit the current flow from the tungsten. Orbital weld heads contain a system of precision planetary gears that can wear out over time. Proper cleaning and maintenance is required.

Successful orbital welding is also dependent upon using high quality tubing material. Typically only 316L stainless steel tubing (not pipe) and fittings are used for automatic orbital welding and are obtained from a number of specialty manufacturers. The weld quality depends upon having a reasonably clean source of Argon for backing and shielding gas. Minimum purity would be 99.995% for typical industrial applications. For some applications it is necessary to use ultra high purity argon, 99.9998% purity and such applications requires the use of all high purity purge equipment (valves, regulators and flow control). Typically, no rubber components can be used for purge gas apparatus since the rubber absorbs and releases moisture and oxygen into the argon stream. Moisture and oxygen (in Argon) are contaminants detrimental to a successful automatic orbital weld.

Weld coupons, pieces of metal used to test a welders' skill, are typically prepared at the beginning of a welding shift, any time any variable is adjusted or changed and at the end of the shift (and more frequently as required by an inspector). Each coupon must be examined internally and externally to verify full penetration, proper bead width and other criteria. With smaller diameter pipe or tubing, it is usually necessary to section open the coupon to examine the weld bead. All coupons must exhibit complete penetration and consistent bead width. Variations in consistency are an indicator of a problem that must be resolved before continuing.

Orbital welding is more commonly performed on tubing than on pipe for several reasons, most important being that the production of tubing yields very consistent outside diameters which is critical to proper fit up in the weld head.

Automatic Orbital GTA welding has become the standard joining method for high integrity gas and liquid systems used in the Semiconductor and Pharmaceutical manufacturing industries. These systems are rated for extreme purity and leak tight integrity. An entire specialty industry supplying valves, fittings, regulators, gauges and other components for orbital welding and use in high purity applications has developed since the mid 1980s. For tube welding in high purity applications only a fully enclosed weld head may be used.

=== Materials ===
Orbital welding has almost always exclusively been carried out by the Tungsten Inert Gas (TIG / GTAW) technique using non-consumable electrodes, with additional cold-wire feed where necessary. The easy control of heat input makes TIG-welding the ideal welding method for fully orbital welding of tubes with specialist orbital welding heads, that incorporate a clamping device, a TIG electrode on an orbital travel device and a shielding gas chamber. Many different types of metal can be welded; high-strength, high-temperature and corrosion-resistant steels, unalloyed and low-alloyed carbon steels, nickel alloys, titanium, copper, aluminum and associated alloys. Carried out in an inert atmosphere, this controlled technique produces results that are extremely clean, have low particle counts and are free from unwanted spatter. This enables the highest demands to be met regarding the mechanical and optical properties of a weld seam.

=== Tube diameters ===
Due to the precision of orbital TIG welding, even the smallest standard tube diameters from 1.6 millimetres can be processed. On a larger scale, pipes with diameters up to 170mm and walls up to 3.5mm thick can be joined using closed chamber weld heads. These weld heads allow the torch to be positioned very precisely and ensure that the pipe is held securely. The inert gas atmosphere in the closed chamber prevents heat from tinting, even with the most sensitive of materials. For tube diameters between 8 and 275mm, it is possible to use more manageable open welding heads (except for high purity applications). A flexible hose system is used to supply the welding head with power, inert gas, cooling water and filler wire where required. The need for filler wire during the welding process depends on the type of welding task; thicker tube walls and difficult-to-control parent materials require the use of additional material, whereas thin-walled tubes can be welded without extra wire.

In order to create high-quality weld seams it is essential that tube ends are carefully prepared with the edges of the workpieces being free of scale and impurities. For thinner-walled tubes up to medium diameters, a simple right-angled saw cut is often sufficient. For thicker tube walls it is necessary to prepare the edges more carefully, for example using a U-groove cross-section.

=== Business sectors and markets ===
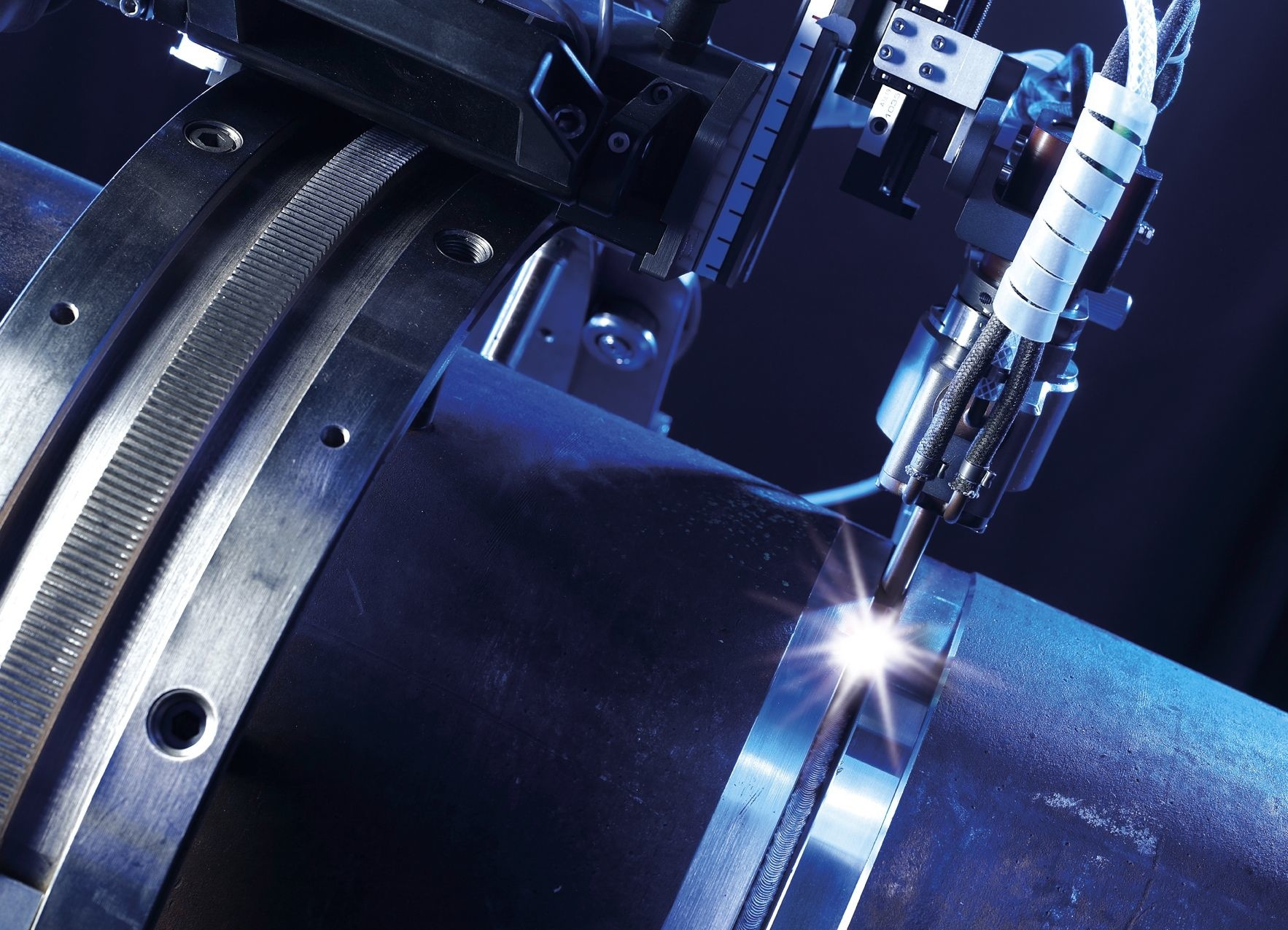
Hot wire narrow gap welding in the production of power stations

Owing to its ability to realise high-purity results, orbital welding found its place in the production of clean-room components for the semiconductor industry. Its application has now expanded to the construction of pipework and equipment for diverse industries like food processing, pharmaceuticals, chemical engineering, automotive engineering, biotechnology, shipbuilding and aerospace. Automated orbital TIG welding is also used in the construction of power stations, (thermal power plants). The construction materials used must be able to withstand the enormous mechanical loads produced by the high pressures and temperatures created by the media carried in the tubes. Notches, pores and inclusions in the weld seams must be avoided at all costs, as these create weak points that can lead to subsequent formation of cracks. These in turn can have serious consequences in terms of component failure. This means that tubes are often made from nickel-based materials with walls up to 200mm thick. One manufacturer has developed an orbital narrow gap welding system with hot-wire feed specifically for this purpose, which uses running gear that moves on a guide ring fixed around the tube. This new variant has created a lot of interest in the sector, with the worldwide boom in power station construction fueling the never-ending search for increasingly productive manufacturing methods using new types of high-temperature steels.

== Conclusion ==
Along with the current methods of using TIG cold and hot wire welding, there has also been steady progress in the development of MIG/MAG/FCAW welding which allows a whole range of new applications in a variety of industries including aerospace, medical, automotive and more. Orbital welding can provide reliable welding of reproducible quality using wide-ranging techniques and differing types of technique. This can be performed to a high standard even when using unusual materials, thick walls, small tube diameters and even within a difficult working environment. The cost of orbital welding equipment is 5-10 times the initial capital cost required in conventional welding equipment but the productivity is also significantly higher than conventional TIG (2-3 times).
