= Shielded metal arc welding =

Manual arc welding process

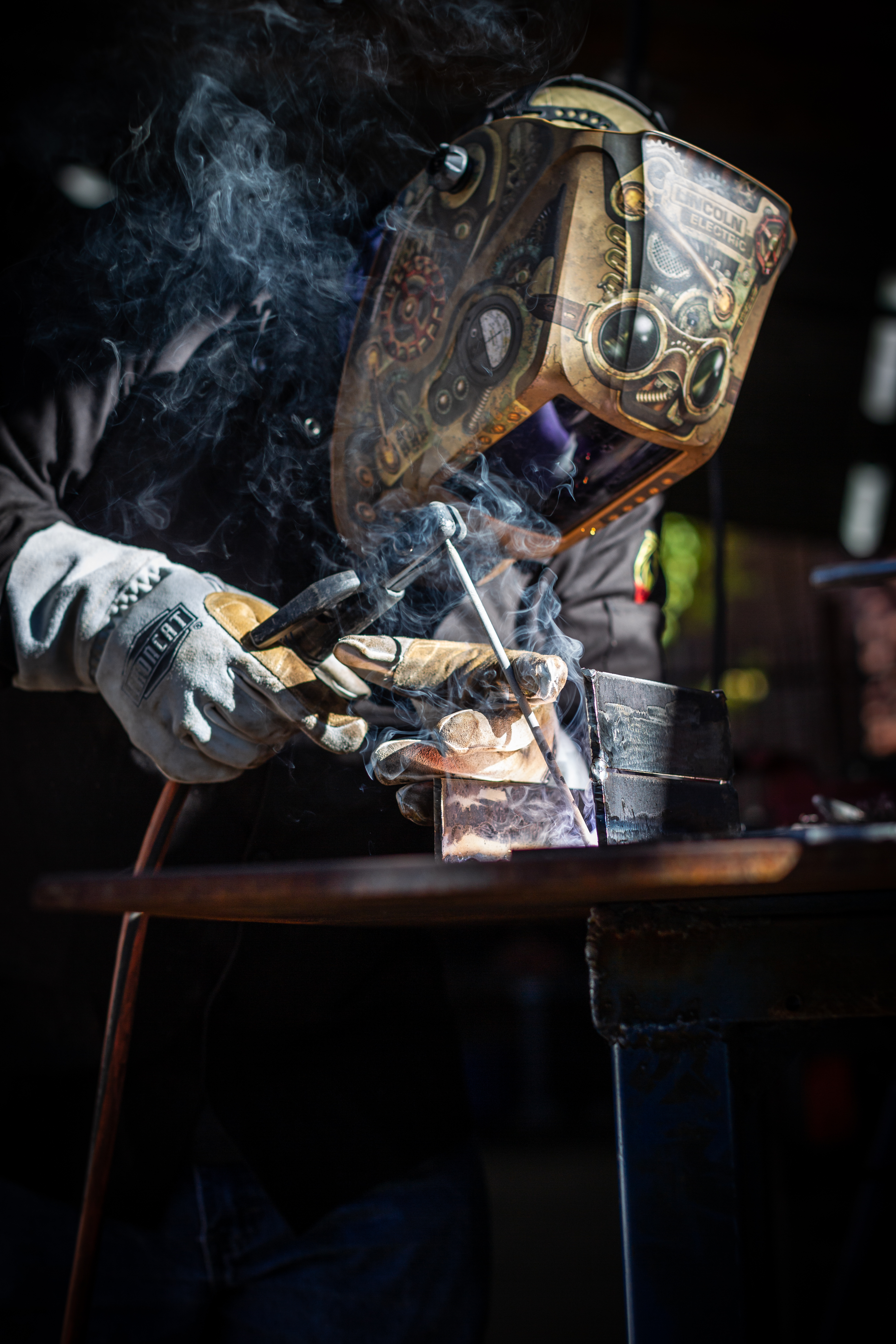
Shielded metal arc welding

Shielded metal arc welding (SMAW), also known as manual metal arc welding (MMA or MMAW), flux shielded arc welding or informally as stick welding, is a manual arc welding process that uses a consumable electrode covered with a flux to lay the weld.

An electric current, in the form of either alternating current or direct current from a welding power supply, is used to form an electric arc between the electrode and the metals to be joined. The workpiece and the electrode melt forming a pool of molten metal (weld pool) that cools to form a joint. As the weld is laid, the flux coating of the electrode disintegrates, giving off vapors that serve as a shielding gas and providing a layer of slag, both of which protect the weld area from atmospheric contamination.

Because of the versatility of the process and the simplicity of its equipment and operation, shielded metal arc welding is one of the world's first and most popular welding processes. It dominates other welding processes in the maintenance and repair industry, and though flux-cored arc welding is growing in popularity, SMAW continues to be used extensively in the construction of heavy steel structures and in industrial fabrication. The process is used primarily to weld iron and steels (including stainless steel) but aluminium, nickel and copper alloys can also be welded with this method.

== Development ==
After the discovery of the short pulsed electric arc in 1800 by Humphry Davy and of the continuous electric arc in 1802 by Vasily Petrov, there was little development in electrical welding until Auguste de Méritens developed a carbon arc torch that was patented in 1881.

In 1885, Nikolay Benardos and Stanisław Olszewski developed carbon arc welding, obtaining American patents from 1887 showing a rudimentary electrode holder. In 1888, the consumable metal electrode was invented by Nikolay Slavyanov. Later in 1890, C. L. Coffin received U.S. patent 428,459 for his arc welding method that utilized a metal electrode. The process, like SMAW, deposited melted electrode metal into the weld as filler.

Around 1900, Arthur Percy Strohmenger and Oscar Kjellberg released the first coated electrodes. Strohmenger used clay and lime coating to stabilize the arc, while Kjellberg dipped iron wire into mixtures of carbonates and silicates to coat the electrode. In 1912, Strohmenger released a heavily coated electrode, but high cost and complex production methods prevented these early electrodes from gaining popularity. In 1927, the development of an extrusion process reduced the cost of coating electrodes while allowing manufacturers to produce more complex coating mixtures designed for specific applications. In the 1950s, manufacturers introduced iron powder into the flux coating, making it possible to increase the welding speed.

In 1945 Karl Kristian Masden described an automated variation of SMAW, now known as gravity welding. It briefly gained popularity in the 1960s after receiving publicity for its use in Japanese shipyards though today its applications are limited. Another little used variation of the process, known as firecracker welding, was developed around the same time by George Hafergut in Austria. In 1964 laser welding was developed in Bell Laboratory with the intention of using this technology as a communication tool. Due to the large force of energy coupled with the small area of focus, this laser became a powerful heat source for cutting and tooling.

== Operation ==
SMAW weld area

Diagram of arc and weld area, in shielded metal arc welding: 1. Coating Flow; 2. Electrode; 3. Shield Gas; 4. Fusion; 5. Base metal; 6. Weld metal; 7. Solidified Slag

To strike the electric arc, the electrode is brought into contact with the workpiece by a very light touch of the electrode to the base metal. The electrode is then pulled back slightly. This initiates the arc and thus the melting of the workpiece and the consumable electrode, and causes droplets of the electrode to be passed from the electrode to the weld pool. Striking an arc, which varies widely based upon electrode and workpiece composition, can be the hardest skill for beginners. The orientation of the electrode to workpiece is where most stumble; if the electrode is held at a perpendicular angle to the workpiece, the tip will likely stick to the metal, which will fuse the electrode to the workpiece, causing it to heat up very rapidly. The tip of the electrode needs to be at a lower angle to the workpiece, which allows the weld pool to flow out of the arc. As the electrode melts, the flux covering disintegrates, giving off shielding gases that protect the weld area from oxygen and other atmospheric gases. In addition, the flux provides molten slag which covers the filler as it travels from electrode to the weld pool. Once part of the weld pool, the slag floats to the surface and protects the weld from contamination as it solidifies. Once hardened, it must be chipped away to reveal the finished weld. As welding progresses and the electrode melts, the welder must periodically stop welding to remove the remaining electrode stub and insert a new electrode into the electrode holder. This activity, combined with chipping away the slag, reduces the amount of time that the welder can spend laying the weld, making SMAW one of the least efficient welding processes. In general, the operator factor, or the percentage of operator's time spent laying weld, is approximately 25%.

The actual welding technique utilized depends on the electrode, the composition of the workpiece, and the position of the joint being welded. The choice of electrode and welding position also determine the welding speed. Flat welds require the least operator skill, and can be done with electrodes that melt quickly but solidify slowly. This permits higher welding speeds.

Sloped, vertical or overhead welding requires more operator skill, and often necessitates the use of an electrode that solidifies quickly to prevent the molten metal from flowing out of the weld pool. However, this generally means that the electrode melts less quickly, thus increasing the time required to lay the weld.

=== Quality ===
The most common quality problems associated with SMAW include weld spatter, porosity, poor fusion, shallow penetration, and cracking.

Weld spatter, while not affecting the integrity of the weld, damages its appearance and increases cleaning costs. Secondary finishing services are often required due to the aesthetic appearance caused by the occurrence of molten splatter. It can be caused by excessively high current, a long arc, or arc blow, a condition associated with direct current characterized by the electric arc being deflected away from the weld pool by magnetic forces. Arc blow can also cause porosity in the weld, as can joint contamination, high welding speed, and a long welding arc, especially when low-hydrogen electrodes are used.

Defects to weld strength make welds prone to cracking. Porosity of the weld bead can cause serious weakening and is often detectable only via advanced nondestructive testing methods. Porosity occurs when the gases produced by the weld flux insufficiently shield the molten weld metal. An overexposed weld bead absorbs nitrogen, oxygen, and hydrogen from the atmosphere; these gases form tiny voids in the weld bead and are released while the weld cools. Poor fusion also affects the strength of the weld and is often easily visible. This is caused by low current, contaminated joint surfaces, or the use of an improper electrode. Shallow welds are weaker and can be mitigated by decreasing welding speed, increasing the current, or using a smaller electrode.

Other factors in cracking propensity include high content of carbon, alloy, or sulfur in the base material, especially if low-hydrogen electrodes and preheating are not employed. Furthermore, workpieces should not be excessively constrained, as this introduces residual stresses into the workpieces (and specifically into the weld) as they expand and contract due to heating and cooling. As the weld cools and contracts, this residual stress can cause cracking in the weld.

=== Safety ===
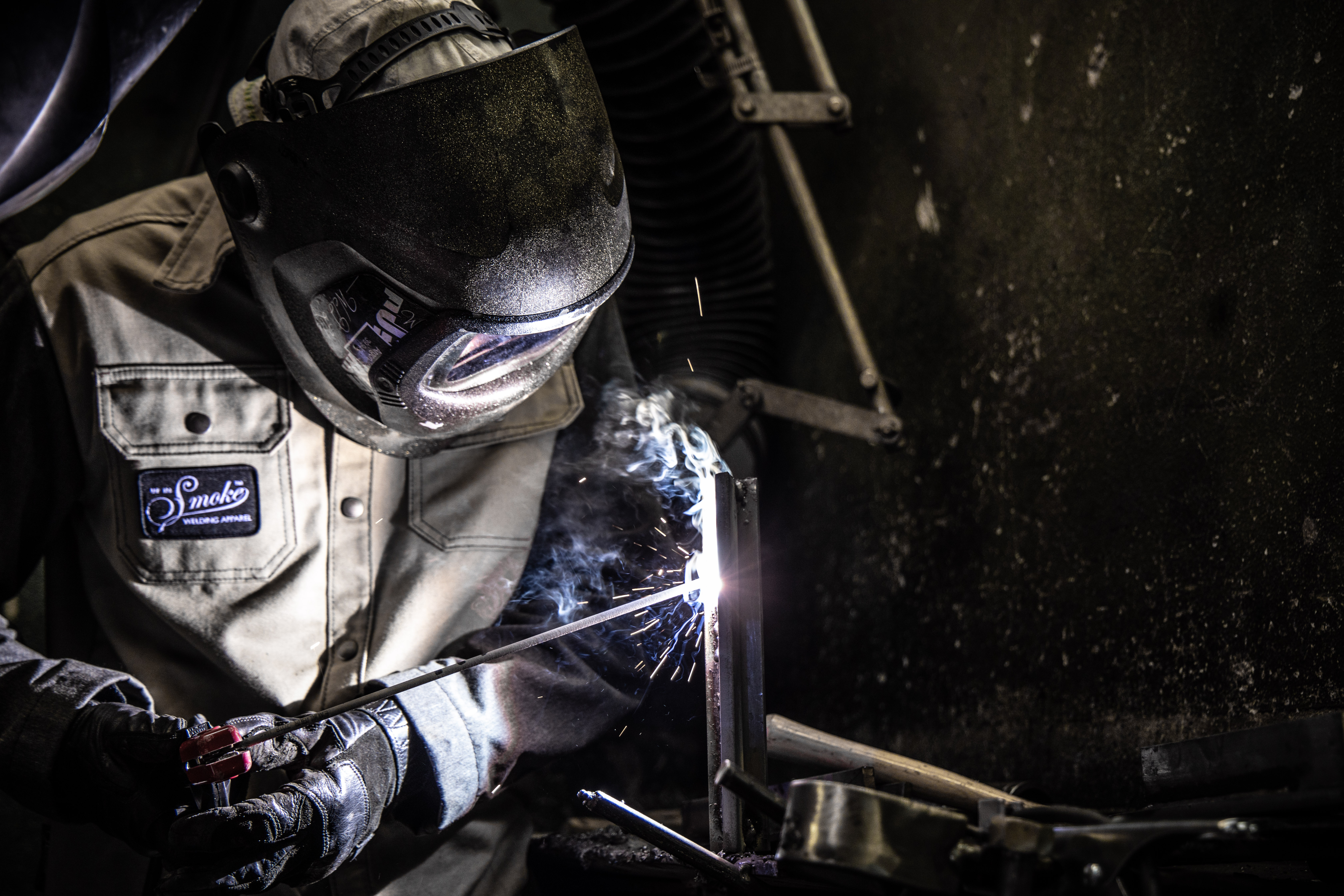
Personal protection equipment

SMAW welding, like other welding methods, can be a dangerous and unhealthy practice if proper precautions are not taken. The process uses an open electric arc, which presents a risk of burns which are prevented by personal protective equipment in the form of heavy leather gloves and long sleeve jackets. Additionally, the brightness of the weld area can lead to a condition called arc eye or flash burn, in which ultraviolet light causes inflammation of the cornea and can burn the retinas of the eyes. Welding helmets with dark face plates are worn to prevent this exposure, and in recent years, new helmet models have been produced that feature a face plate that self-darkens upon exposure to high amounts of UV light. To protect bystanders, especially in industrial environments, translucent welding curtains often surround the welding area. These curtains, made of a polyvinyl chloride plastic film, shield nearby workers from exposure to the UV light from the electric arc, but should not be used to replace the filter glass used in helmets.

In addition, the vaporizing metal and flux materials expose welders to dangerous gases and particulate matter. The smoke produced contains particles of various types of oxides. The size of the particles in question tends to influence the toxicity of the fumes, with smaller particles presenting a greater danger. Additionally, gases like carbon dioxide and ozone can form, which can prove dangerous if ventilation is inadequate. Some of the latest welding masks are fitted with an electric powered fan to help disperse harmful fumes.

=== Application and materials ===
Shielded metal arc welding is one of the world's most popular welding processes, accounting for over half of all welding in some countries. Because of its versatility and simplicity, it is particularly dominant in the maintenance and repair industry, and is heavily used in the construction of steel structures and in industrial fabrication. In recent years its use has declined as flux-cored arc welding has expanded in the construction industry and gas metal arc welding has become more popular in industrial environments. However, because of the low equipment cost and wide applicability, the process will likely remain popular, especially among amateurs and small businesses where specialized welding processes are uneconomical and unnecessary.

SMAW is often used to weld carbon steel, low and high alloy steel, stainless steel, cast iron, and ductile iron. While less popular for non-ferrous materials, it can be used on nickel and copper and their alloys and, in rare cases, on aluminium. The thickness of the material being welded is bounded on the low end primarily by the skill of the welder, but rarely does it drop below 1.5 mm (0.06 in). No upper bound exists: with proper joint preparation and use of multiple passes, materials of virtually unlimited thicknesses can be joined. Furthermore, depending on the electrode used and the skill of the welder, SMAW can be used in any position.

== Equipment ==
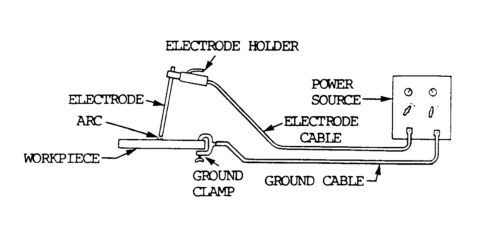
SMAW system setup

Shielded metal arc welding equipment typically consists of a constant current welding power supply and an electrode, with an electrode holder, a ground clamp, and welding cables (also known as welding leads) connecting the two.

=== Power supply ===
The power supply used in SMAW has constant current output, ensuring that the current (and thus the heat) remains relatively constant, even if the arc distance and voltage change. This is important because most applications of SMAW are manual, requiring that an operator hold the torch. Maintaining a suitably steady arc distance is difficult if a constant voltage power source is used instead, since it can cause dramatic heat variations and make welding more difficult. However, because the current is not maintained absolutely constant, skilled welders performing complicated welds can vary the arc length to cause minor fluctuations in the current.

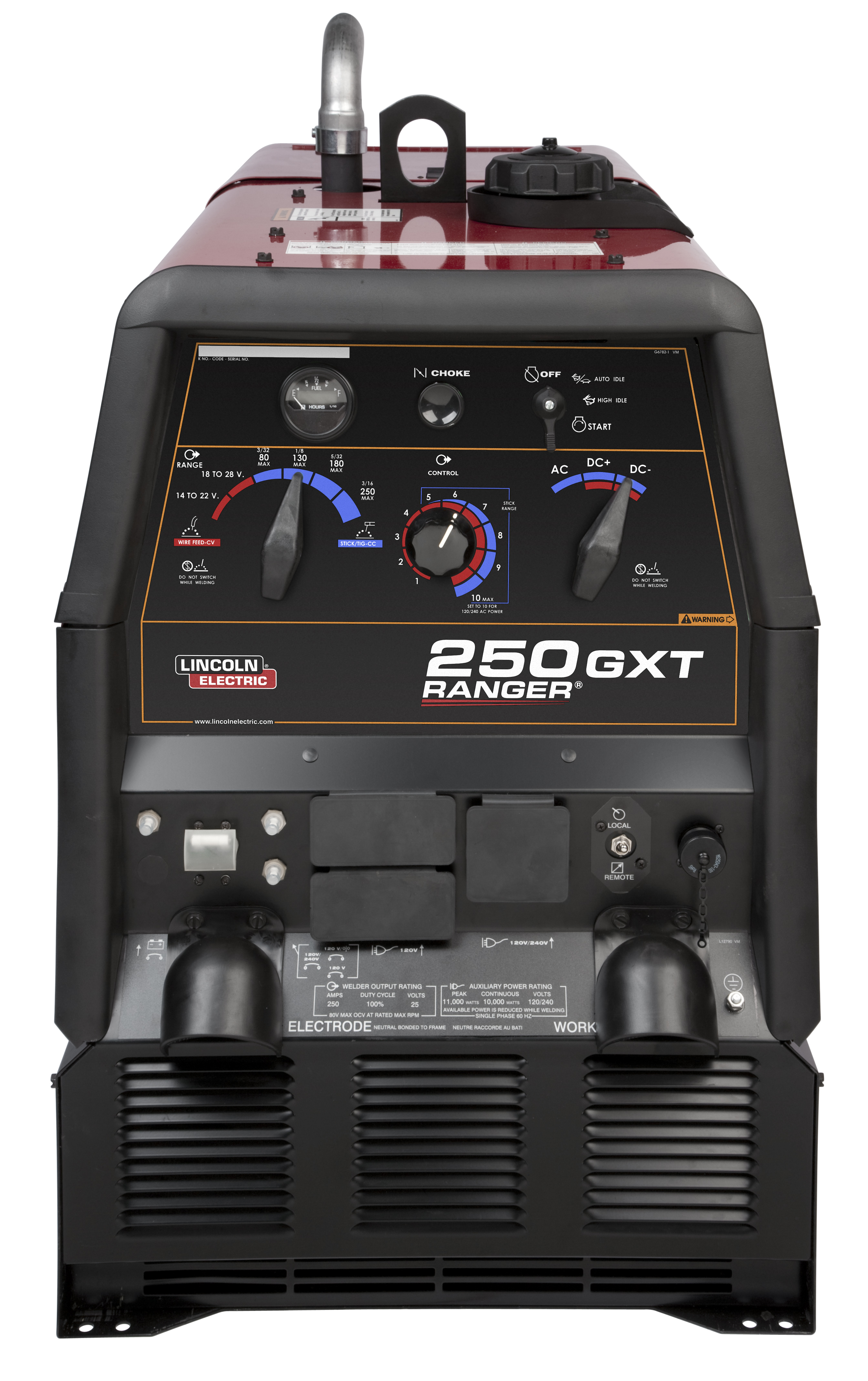
A high output welding power supply for SMAW, GTAW, MIG, Flux-Cored, & Gouging

The preferred polarity of the SMAW system depends primarily upon the electrode being used and the desired properties of the weld. Direct current with a negatively charged electrode (DCEN) causes heat to build up in the parent material, decreasing the electrode melting rate and increasing the depth of the weld. Reversing the polarity so that the electrode is positively charged (DCEP) and the workpiece is negatively charged increases electrode wear and decreases the weld penetration. With alternating current the polarity changes over 100 times per second, creating an even heat distribution and providing a balance between electrode melting rate and penetration.

Typically, the equipment used for SMAW consists of a step-down transformer and for direct current models a rectifier, which converts alternating current into direct current. Because the power normally supplied to the welding machine is high-voltage alternating current, the welding transformer is used to reduce the voltage and increase the current. As a result, instead of 220 V at 50 A, for example, the power supplied by the transformer is around 17–45 V at currents up to 600 A. A number of different types of transformers can be used to produce this effect, including multiple coil and inverter machines, with each using a different method to manipulate the welding current. The multiple coil type adjusts the current by either varying the number of turns in the coil (in tap-type transformers) or by varying the distance between the primary and secondary coils (in movable coil or movable core transformers). Inverters, which are smaller and thus more portable, use electronic components to change the current characteristics.

Electrical generators and alternators are frequently used as portable welding power supplies, but because of lower efficiency and greater costs, they are less frequently used in industry. Maintenance also tends to be more difficult, because of the complexities of using a combustion engine as a power source. However, in one sense they are simpler: the use of a separate rectifier is unnecessary because they can provide either AC or DC. However, the engine driven units are most practical in field work where the welding often must be done out of doors and in locations where transformer type welders are not usable because there is no power source available to be transformed.

In some units, the alternator is essentially the same as that used in portable generating sets used to supply mains power, modified to produce a higher current at a lower voltage but still at the 50 or 60 Hz grid frequency. In higher-quality units, an alternator with more poles is used and supplies current at a higher frequency, such as 400 Hz. The smaller amount of time the high-frequency waveform spends near zero makes it much easier to strike and maintain a stable arc than with the cheaper grid-frequency sets or grid-frequency mains-powered units.

=== Electrode ===
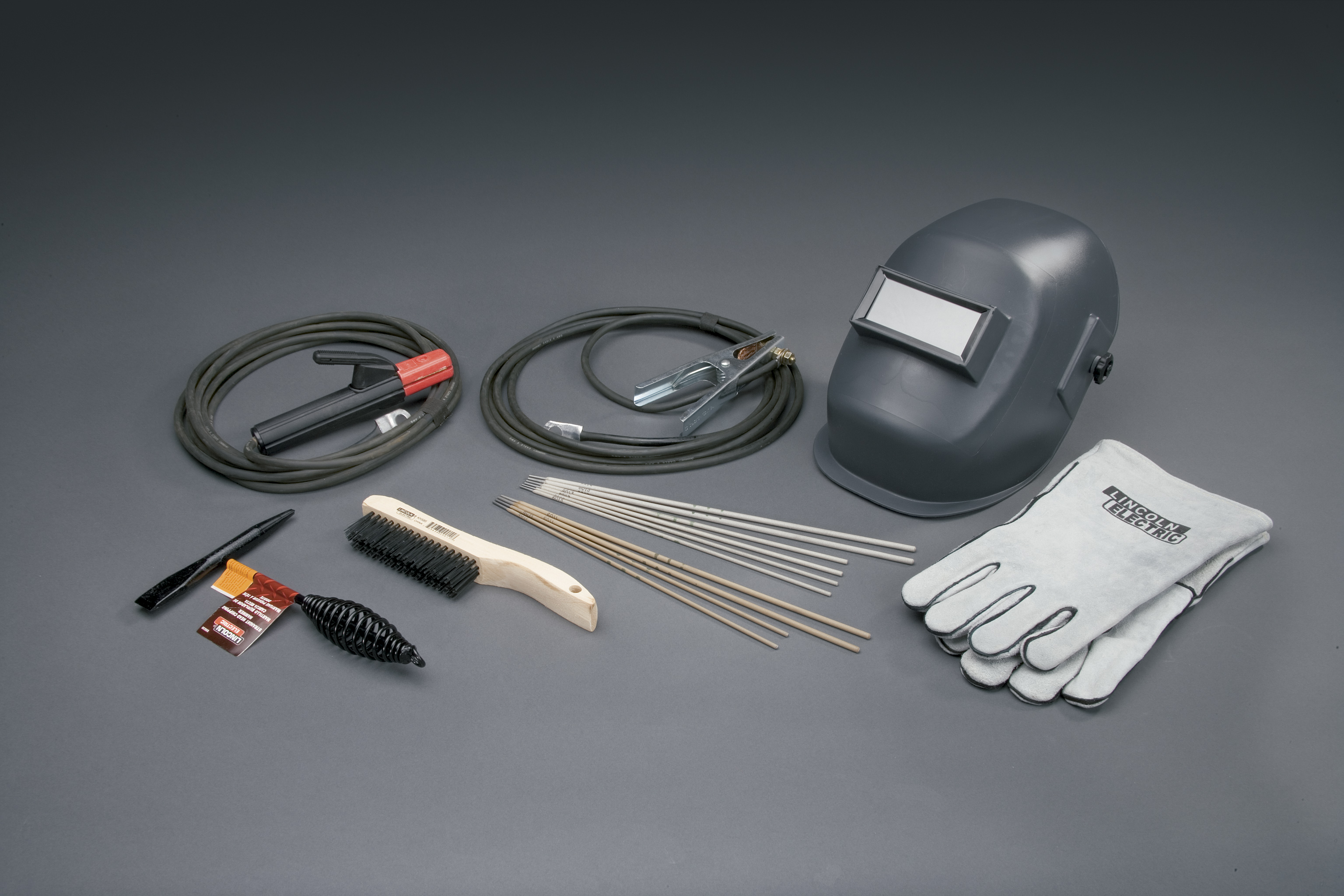
Various accessories for SMAW

The choice of electrode for SMAW depends on a number of factors, including the weld material, welding position and the desired weld properties. The electrode is coated in a metal mixture called flux, which gives off gases as it decomposes to prevent weld contamination, introduces deoxidizers to purify the weld, causes weld-protecting slag to form, improves the arc stability, and provides alloying elements to improve the weld quality. Electrodes can be divided into three groups—those designed to melt quickly are called "fast-fill" electrodes, those designed to solidify quickly are called "fast-freeze" electrodes, and intermediate electrodes go by the name "fill-freeze" or "fast-follow" electrodes. Fast-fill electrodes are designed to melt quickly so that the welding speed can be maximized, while fast-freeze electrodes supply filler metal that solidifies quickly, making welding in a variety of positions possible by preventing the weld pool from shifting significantly before solidifying.

The composition of the electrode core is generally similar and sometimes identical to that of the base material. But even though a number of feasible options exist, a slight difference in alloy composition can strongly impact the properties of the resulting weld. This is especially true of alloy steels such as HSLA steels. Likewise, electrodes of compositions similar to those of the base materials are often used for welding nonferrous materials like aluminium and copper. However, sometimes it is desirable to use electrodes with core materials significantly different from the base material. For example, stainless steel electrodes are sometimes used to weld two pieces of carbon steel, and are often utilized to weld stainless steel workpieces with carbon steel workpieces.

Electrode coatings can consist of a number of different compounds, including rutile, calcium fluoride, cellulose, and iron powder. Rutile electrodes, coated with 25%–45% TiO_{2}, are characterized by ease of use and good appearance of the resulting weld. However, they create welds with high hydrogen content, encouraging embrittlement and cracking. Electrodes containing calcium fluoride (CaF_{2}), sometimes known as basic or low-hydrogen electrodes, are hygroscopic and must be stored in dry conditions. They produce strong welds, but with a coarse and convex-shaped joint surface. Electrodes coated with cellulose, especially when combined with rutile, provide deep weld penetration, but because of their high moisture content, special procedures must be used to prevent excessive risk of cracking. Finally, iron powder is a common coating additive that increases the rate at which the electrode fills the weld joint, up to twice as fast.

To identify different electrodes, the American Welding Society established a system that assigns electrodes with a four- or five-digit number. Covered electrodes made of mild or low alloy steel carry the prefix E, followed by their number. The first two or three digits of the number specify the tensile strength of the weld metal, in thousand pounds per square inch (ksi). The penultimate digit generally identifies the welding positions permissible with the electrode, typically using the values 1 (normally fast-freeze electrodes, implying all position welding) and 2 (normally fast-fill electrodes, implying horizontal welding only). The welding current and type of electrode covering are specified by the last two digits together. When applicable, a suffix is used to denote the alloying element being contributed by the electrode.

Common electrodes include the E6010, a fast-freeze, all-position electrode with a minimum tensile strength of 60 ksi (410 MPa) which is operated using DCEP, and provides deep weld penetration with a forceful arc capable of burning through light rust or oxides on the workpiece. E6011 is similar except its flux coating allows it to be used with alternating current in addition to DCEP. E7024 is a fast-fill electrode, used primarily to make flat or horizontal fillet welds using AC, DCEN, or DCEP. Examples of fill-freeze electrodes are the E6012, E6013, and E7014, all of which provide a compromise between fast welding speeds and all-position welding.

=== Process variations ===
Though SMAW is almost exclusively a manual arc welding process, one notable process variation exists, known as gravity welding or gravity arc welding. It serves as an automated version of the traditional shielded metal arc welding process, employing an electrode holder attached to an inclined bar along the length of the weld. Once started, the process continues until the electrode is spent, allowing the operator to manage multiple gravity welding systems. The electrodes employed (often E6027 or E7024) are coated heavily in flux, and are typically 71 cm (28 in) in length and about 6.35 mm (0.25 in) thick. As in manual SMAW, a constant current welding power supply is used, with either negative polarity direct current or alternating current. Due to a rise in the use of semiautomatic welding processes such as flux-cored arc welding, the popularity of gravity welding has fallen as its economic advantage over such methods is often minimal. Other SMAW-related methods that are even less frequently used include firecracker welding, an automatic method for making butt and fillet welds, and massive electrode welding, a process for welding large components or structures that can deposit up to 27 kg (60 lb) of weld metal per hour.
