= Gas metal arc welding =

Industrial welding process

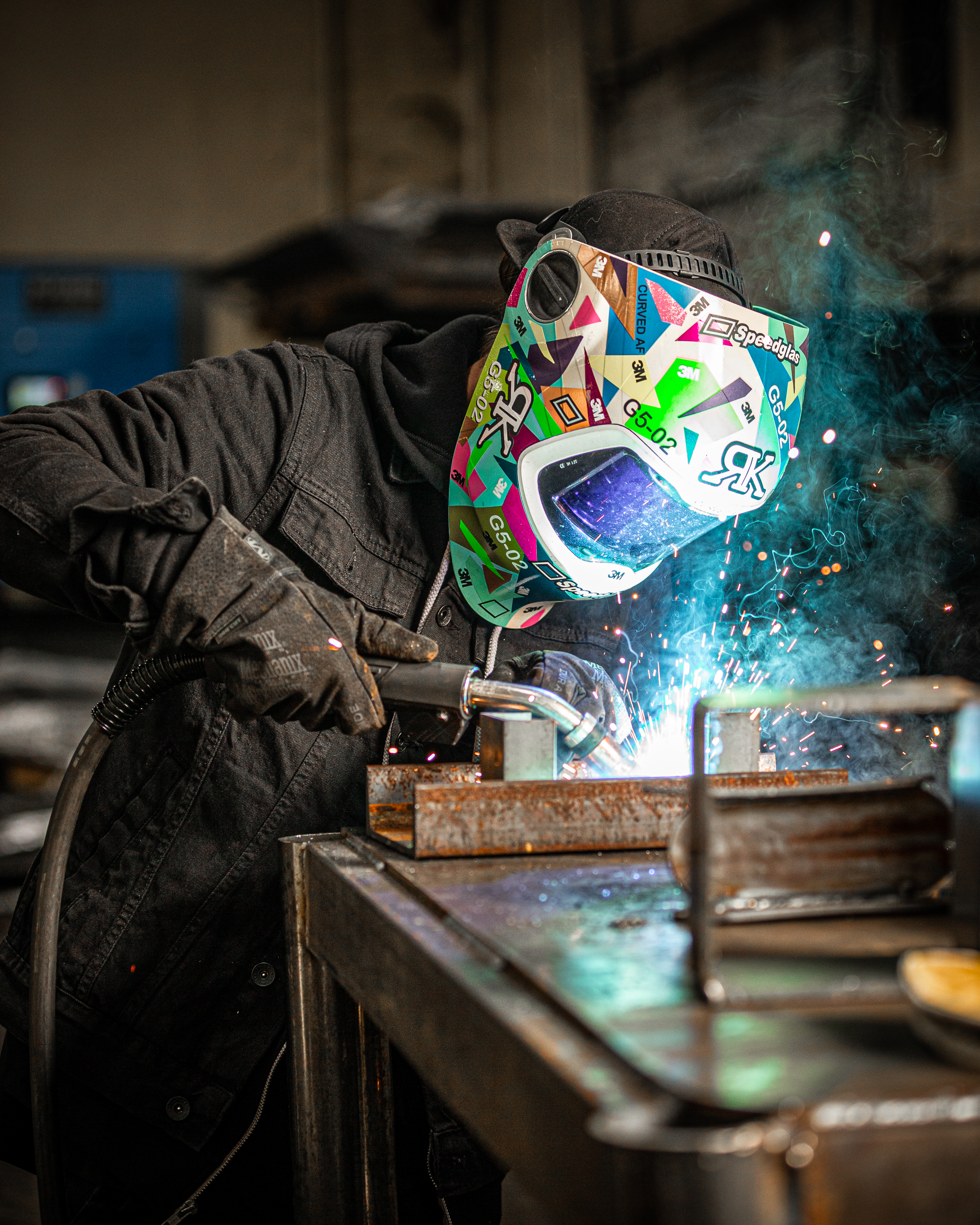
Spray transfer GMAW

Gas metal arc welding (GMAW), sometimes referred to by its subtypes metal inert gas (MIG) and metal active gas (MAG) is a welding process in which an electric arc forms between a consumable MIG wire electrode and the workpiece metal(s), which heats the workpiece metal(s), causing them to fuse (melt and join). Along with the wire electrode, a shielding gas feeds through the welding gun, which shields the process from atmospheric contamination.

The process can be semi-automatic or automatic. A constant voltage, direct current power source is most commonly used with GMAW, but constant current systems, as well as alternating current, can be used. There are four primary methods of metal transfer in GMAW, called globular, short-circuiting, spray, and pulsed-spray, each of which has distinct properties and corresponding advantages and limitations.

Originally developed in the 1940s for welding aluminium and other non-ferrous materials, GMAW was soon applied to steels because it provided faster welding time compared to other welding processes. The cost of inert gas limited its use in steels until several years later, when the use of semi-inert gases such as carbon dioxide became common. Further developments during the 1950s and 1960s gave the process more versatility and as a result, it became a highly used industrial process. Today, GMAW is the most common industrial welding process, preferred for its versatility, speed and the relative ease of adapting the process to robotic automation. Unlike welding processes that do not employ a shielding gas, such as shielded metal arc welding, it is rarely used outdoors or in other areas of moving air. A related process, flux cored arc welding, often does not use a shielding gas, but instead employs an electrode wire that is hollow and filled with flux.

== Development ==
The principles of gas metal arc welding was first investigated in the early 19th century, after Humphry Davy discovered short pulsed electric arcs in 1800. Vasily Petrov independently produced the continuous electric arc in 1802 (followed by Davy after 1808). It was not until the 1880s that the technology became developed with the aim of industrial usage. At first, carbon electrodes were used in carbon arc welding. By 1890, metal electrodes had been invented by Nikolay Slavyanov and C. L. Coffin. In 1920, an early predecessor of GMAW was invented by P. O. Nobel of General Electric. It used direct current with a bare electrode wire and used arc voltage to regulate the feed rate. It did not use a shielding gas to protect the weld, as developments in welding atmospheres did not take place until later that decade. In 1926 another forerunner of GMAW was released, but it was not suitable for practical use.

In 1948, GMAW was developed by the Battelle Memorial Institute. It used a smaller diameter electrode and a constant voltage power source developed by H. E. Kennedy. It offered a high deposition rate, but the high cost of inert gases limited its use to non-ferrous materials and prevented cost savings. In 1953, the use of carbon dioxide as a welding atmosphere was developed, and it quickly gained popularity in GMAW, since it made welding steel more economical. In 1958 and 1959, the short-arc variation of GMAW was released, which increased welding versatility and made the welding of thin materials possible while relying on smaller electrode wires and more advanced power supplies. It quickly became the most popular GMAW variation. The spray-arc transfer variation was developed in the early 1960s, when experimenters added small amounts of oxygen to inert gases. More recently, pulsed current has been applied, giving rise to a new method called the pulsed spray-arc variation.

GMAW is one of the most popular welding methods, especially in industrial environments. It is used extensively by the sheet metal industry and the automobile industry. There, the method is often used for arc spot welding, replacing riveting or resistance spot welding. It is also popular for automated welding, where robots handle the workpieces and the welding gun to accelerate manufacturing. GMAW can be difficult to perform well outdoors, since drafts can dissipate the shielding gas and allow contaminants into the weld; flux cored arc welding is better suited for outdoor use such as in construction. Likewise, GMAW's use of a shielding gas does not lend itself to underwater welding, which is more commonly performed via shielded metal arc welding, flux cored arc welding, or gas tungsten arc welding.

== Equipment ==
To perform gas metal arc welding, the basic necessary equipment is a welding gun, a wire feed unit, a welding power supply, a welding electrode wire, and a shielding gas supply.

=== Welding gun and wire feed unit ===
GMAW torch nozzle cutaway image: 1. Torch handle; 2. Molded phenolic dielectric (shown in white) and threaded metal nut insert (yellow); 3. Shielding gas diffuser; 4. Contact tip; 5. Nozzle output face

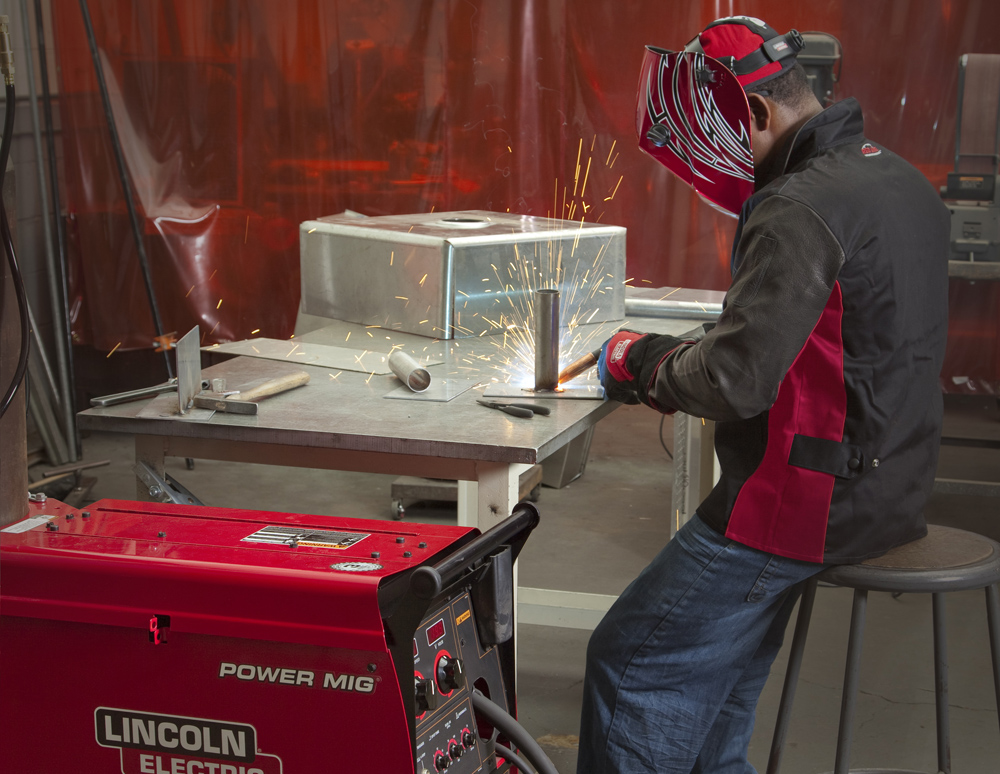
GMAW on stainless steel

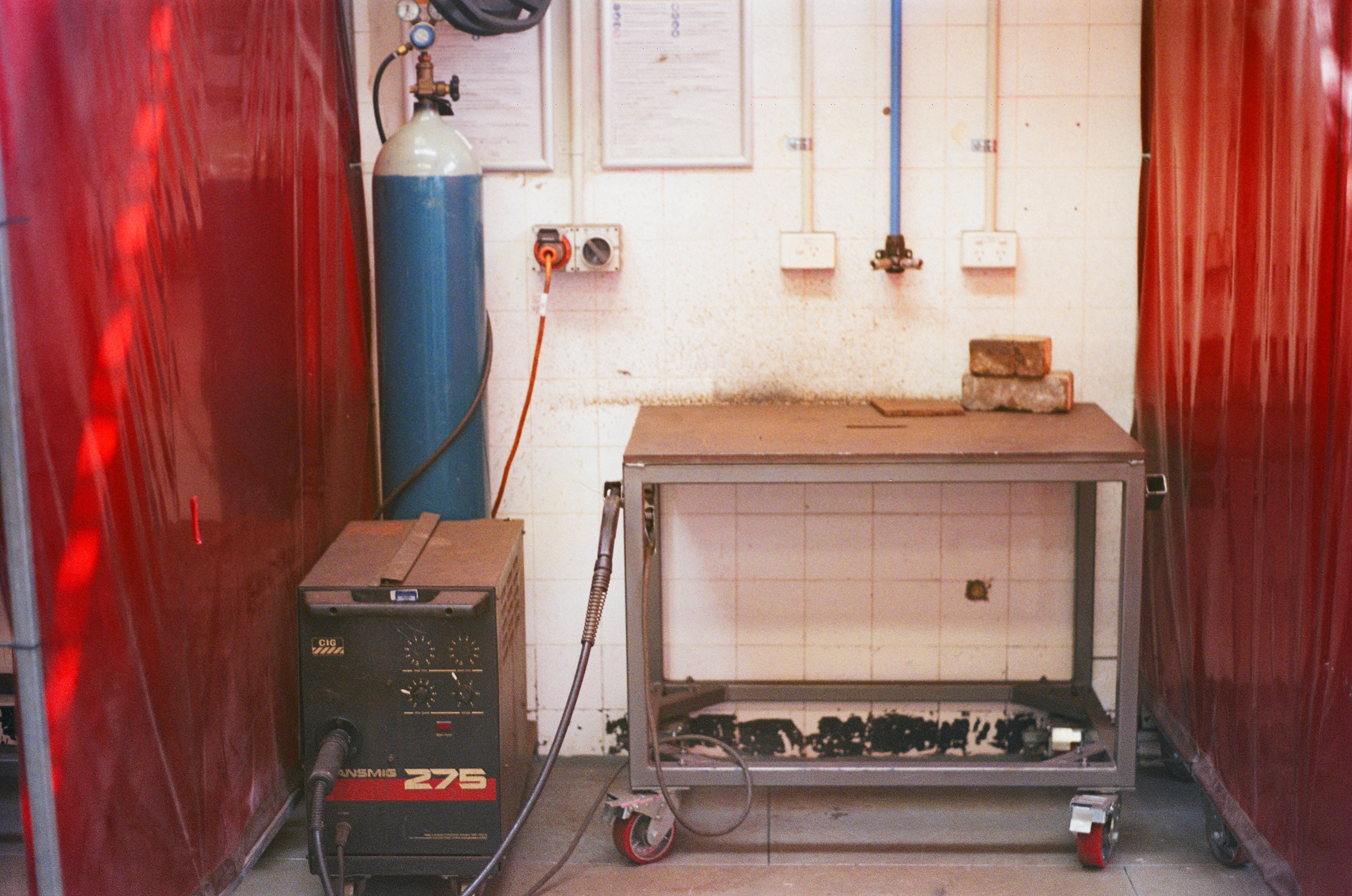
Metal inert gas (MIG) welding station

The typical GMAW welding gun has a number of key parts—a control switch, a contact tip, a power cable, a gas nozzle, an electrode conduit and liner, and a gas hose. The control switch, or trigger, when pressed by the operator, initiates the wire feed, electric power, and the shielding gas flow, causing an electric arc to be struck. The contact tip, normally made of copper and sometimes chemically treated to reduce spatter, is connected to the welding power source through the power cable and transmits the electrical energy to the electrode while directing it to the weld area. It must be firmly secured and properly sized, since it must allow the electrode to pass while maintaining electrical contact. On the way to the contact tip, the wire is protected and guided by the electrode conduit and liner, which help prevent buckling and maintain an uninterrupted wire feed. The gas nozzle directs the shielding gas evenly into the welding zone. Inconsistent flow may not adequately protect the weld area. Larger nozzles provide greater shielding gas flow, which is useful for high current welding operations that develop a larger molten weld pool. A gas hose from the tanks of shielding gas supplies the gas to the nozzle. Sometimes, a water hose is also built into the welding gun, cooling the gun in high heat operations.

The wire feed unit supplies the electrode to the work, driving it through the conduit and on to the contact tip. Most models provide the wire at a constant feed rate, but more advanced machines can vary the feed rate in response to the arc length and voltage. Some wire feeders can reach feed rates as high as 30 m/min (1200 in/min), but feed rates for semiautomatic GMAW typically range from 2 to 10 m/min (75 – 400 in/min).

=== Tool style ===
The most common electrode holder is a semiautomatic air-cooled holder. Compressed air circulates through it to maintain moderate temperatures. It is used with lower current levels for welding lap or butt joints. The second most common type of electrode holder is semiautomatic water-cooled, where the only difference is that water takes the place of air. It uses higher current levels for welding T or corner joints. The third typical holder type is a water cooled automatic electrode holder—which is typically used with automated equipment.

=== Power supply ===
Most applications of gas metal arc welding use a constant voltage power supply. As a result, any change in arc length (which is directly related to voltage) results in a large change in heat input and current. A shorter arc length causes a much greater heat input, which makes the wire electrode melt more quickly and thereby restore the original arc length. This helps operators keep the arc length consistent even when manually welding with hand-held welding guns. To achieve a similar effect, sometimes a constant current power source is used in combination with an arc voltage-controlled wire feed unit. In this case, a change in arc length makes the wire feed rate adjust to maintain a relatively constant arc length. In rare circumstances, a constant current power source and a constant wire feed rate unit might be coupled, especially for the welding of metals with high thermal conductivities, such as aluminum. This grants the operator additional control over the heat input into the weld, but requires significant skill to perform successfully.

Alternating current is rarely used with GMAW; instead, direct current is employed and the electrode is generally positively charged. Since the anode tends to have a greater heat concentration, this results in faster melting of the feed wire, which increases weld penetration and welding speed. The polarity can be reversed only when special emissive-coated electrode wires are used, but since these are not popular, a negatively charged electrode is rarely employed.

=== Electrode ===
The electrode is a metallic alloy wire, called a MIG wire, whose selection, alloy and size, is based primarily on the composition of the metal being welded, the process variation being used, joint design, and the material surface conditions. Electrode selection greatly influences the mechanical properties of the weld and is a key factor of weld quality. In general the finished weld metal should have mechanical properties similar to those of the base material with no defects such as discontinuities, entrained contaminants or porosity within the weld. To achieve these goals a wide variety of electrodes exist. All commercially available electrodes contain deoxidizing metals such as silicon, manganese, titanium and aluminum in small percentages to help prevent oxygen porosity. Some contain denitriding metals such as titanium and zirconium to avoid nitrogen porosity. Depending on the process variation and base material being welded the diameters of the electrodes used in GMAW typically range from 0.7 to 2.4 mm (0.028 – 0.095 in) but can be as large as 4 mm (0.16 in). The smallest electrodes, generally up to 1.14 mm (0.045 in) are associated with the short-circuiting metal transfer process, while the most common spray-transfer process mode electrodes are usually at least 0.9 mm (0.035 in).

=== Shielding gas ===
GMAW circuit diagram: 1. Welding torch; 2. Workpiece; 3. Power source; 4. Wire feed unit; 5. Electrode source; 6. Shielding gas supply

Shielding gases are necessary for gas metal arc welding to protect the welding area from atmospheric gases such as nitrogen and oxygen, which can cause fusion defects, porosity, and weld metal embrittlement if they come in contact with the electrode, the arc, or the welding metal. This problem is common to all arc welding processes; for example, in the older Shielded-Metal Arc Welding process (SMAW), the electrode is coated with a solid flux which evolves a protective cloud of carbon dioxide when melted by the arc. In GMAW, however, the electrode wire does not have a flux coating, and a separate shielding gas is employed to protect the weld. This eliminates slag, the hard residue from the flux that builds up after welding and must be chipped off to reveal the completed weld.

The choice of a shielding gas depends on several factors, most importantly the type of material being welded and the process variation being used. Pure inert gases such as argon and helium are only used for nonferrous welding; with steel they do not provide adequate weld penetration (argon) or cause an erratic arc and encourage spatter (with helium). Pure carbon dioxide, on the other hand, allows for deep penetration welds but encourages oxide formation, which adversely affects the mechanical properties of the weld. lts low cost makes it an attractive choice, but because of the reactivity of the arc plasma, spatter is unavoidable and welding thin materials is difficult. As a result, argon and carbon dioxide are frequently mixed in a 75%/25% to 90%/10% mixture. Generally, in short circuit GMAW, higher carbon dioxide content increases the weld heat and energy when all other weld parameters (volts, current, electrode type and diameter) are held the same. As the carbon dioxide content increases over 20%, spray transfer GMAW becomes increasingly problematic, especially with smaller electrode diameters.

Argon is also commonly mixed with other gases, oxygen, helium, hydrogen and nitrogen. The addition of up to 5% oxygen (like the higher concentrations of carbon dioxide mentioned above) can be helpful in welding stainless steel, however, in most applications carbon dioxide is preferred. Increased oxygen makes the shielding gas oxidize the electrode, which can lead to porosity in the deposit if the electrode does not contain sufficient deoxidizers. Excessive oxygen, especially when used in application for which it is not prescribed, can lead to brittleness in the heat affected zone. Argon-helium mixtures are extremely inert, and can be used on nonferrous materials. A helium concentration of 50–75% raises the required voltage and increases the heat in the arc, due to helium's higher ionization temperature. Hydrogen is sometimes added to argon in small concentrations (up to about 5%) for welding nickel and thick stainless steel workpieces. In higher concentrations (up to 25% hydrogen), it may be used for welding conductive materials such as copper. However, it should not be used on steel, aluminum or magnesium because it can cause porosity and hydrogen embrittlement.

Shielding gas mixtures of three or more gases are also available. Mixtures of argon, carbon dioxide and oxygen are marketed for welding steels. Other mixtures add a small amount of helium to argon-oxygen combinations. These mixtures are claimed to allow higher arc voltages and welding speed. Helium also sometimes serves as the base gas, with small amounts of argon and carbon dioxide added. However, because it is less dense than air, helium is less effective at shielding the weld than argon—which is denser than air. It also can lead to arc stability and penetration issues, and increased spatter, due to its much more energetic arc plasma. Helium is also substantially more expensive than other shielding gases. Other specialized and often proprietary gas mixtures claim even greater benefits for specific applications.

Despite being poisonous, trace amounts of nitric oxide can be used to prevent the even more troublesome ozone from being formed in the arc.

The desirable rate of shielding-gas flow depends primarily on weld geometry, speed, current, the type of gas, and the metal transfer mode. Welding flat surfaces requires higher flow than welding grooved materials, since gas disperses more quickly. Faster welding speeds, in general, mean that more gas must be supplied to provide adequate coverage. Additionally, higher current requires greater flow, and generally, more helium is required to provide adequate coverage than if argon is used. Perhaps most importantly, the four primary variations of GMAW have differing shielding gas flow requirements—for the small weld pools of the short circuiting and pulsed spray modes, about 10 L/min (20 ft^{3}/h) is generally suitable, whereas for globular transfer, around 15 L/min (30 ft^{3}/h) is preferred. The spray transfer variation normally requires more shielding-gas flow because of its higher heat input and thus larger weld pool. Typical gas-flow amounts are approximately 20–25 L/min (40–50 ft^{3}/h).

=== GMAW-based 3D printing ===
GMAW has also been used as a low-cost method to 3D-print metal objects. Various open source 3D printers have been developed to use GMAW. Such components fabricated from aluminum compete with more traditionally manufactured components on mechanical strength. By forming a bad weld on the first layer, GMAW 3D printed parts can be removed from the substrate with a hammer.

== Operation ==
GMAW weld area: 1. Direction of travel; 2. Contact tube; 3. Electrode; 4. Shielding gas; 5. Molten weld metal; 6. Solidified weld metal; 7. Workpiece

For most of its applications gas metal arc welding is a fairly simple welding process to learn requiring no more than a week or two to master basic welding technique. Even when welding is performed by well-trained operators weld quality can fluctuate since it depends on a number of external factors. All GMAW is dangerous, though perhaps less so than some other welding methods, such as shielded metal arc welding.

=== Technique ===
GMAW welding process filmed through a shaded lens

The techniques required to successfully weld with the GMAW process are not complicated, with most individuals able to achieve reasonable proficiency in a few weeks, assuming proper training and sufficient opportunity to make practice welds. As is the case with many other manual skills, experience and practice will lead to a welder (operator) developing a high level of proficiency. As much of the process is automated, GMAW relieves the welder of the burden of maintaining a precise arc length, as well as feeding filler metal into the weld puddle (fusion zone) at the correct rate, these being coordinated operations that are required in other manual welding processes, such as shielded metal arc ("stick" welding).

Successfully producing a weld with the GMAW process requires that the welder maintain correct gun orientation relative to the joint being welded (the weldment), as well as maintain a uniform rate of travel down the joint so as to produce adequate penetration and weld bead buildup. Movement along the joint may also require a "weaving" component in order to produce a sound weld, especially when welding vertically or overhead. During training, apprentice welders are advised to watch the trailing edge of the weld puddle, not the arc, to ascertain they are progressing down the joint at an optimum rate.

The orientation of the gun relative to the weldment is important, as it affects the way in which the energy of the arc is directed into the constituent pieces. In an ideal weld, 100 percent penetration would be achieved, which when coupled with the buildup of the weld bead, will produce a weld that is theoretically stronger than the constituent pieces. In practice, full penetration is not achieved and in fact, may be undesirable. However, penetration will be deepest when the wire electrode is exactly perpendicular to the surface being welded. Furthermore, deposition of the filler metal, which comes from the melting of the wire electrode, will tend to be uniform with the wire in the perpendicular.

In practice, perpendicularity is not always ideal or even achievable, unless welding a horizontal butt joint. Therefore, the gun will usually be oriented so the wire bisects the angle between the two surfaces being joined. For example, if a 90 degree fillet joint is being welded, a wire angle of 45 degrees should produce the best penetration and filler deposition. A horizontal lap joint, on the other hand, would benefit from a less-acute angle in order to direct more arc energy into the lower piece and less energy into the edge of the upper piece, mostly to avoid melting away the edge.

The travel angle, or lead angle, is the angle of the gun with respect to the direction of travel along the joint, and it should generally remain approximately vertical. Most guns are designed so that when the grip (handle) is parallel to the work surface, a suitable lead angle will result. However, the best angle will vary due to differing shielding gas types and the manner in which they disperse. With pure inert gases, e.g., straight argon, the bottom of the torch is often slightly in front of the upper section, while the opposite is true when the welding atmosphere is carbon dioxide.

Maintaining a relatively-stable contact tip-to-work distance (the stick-out distance) is important. Excessive stick-out may cause the wire electrode to melt too far away from the weldment, causing a sputtering arc, shallow penetration and poor deposition. Excessive stick-out may also cause the shielding gas to not adequately blanket the fusion zone, leading to atmospheric contamination and a porous and unsound weld.

In contrast, insufficient stick-out may increase the rate at which spatter builds up inside the gun's nozzle and in extreme cases, may cause damage to the gun's contact tip due to the wire “burning back” into the tip. Burn-back, in turn, may cause the wire to jam in the tip and stop moving, resulting in "bird-nesting" (bunching up of wire) at the wire-feed mechanism in the welder. The correct stick-out distance will vary with different GMAW processes and applications, with a shorter stick-out distance often used in vertical and overhead welding.

Position welding, that is, welding vertical or overhead joints, may require the use of a weaving technique to assure proper weld deposition and penetration. Position welding is complicated by a tendency for molten metal to run out of the puddle ("weld drip"), especially a problem with overhead joints. Weld drip will result in cratering and undercutting where the bead should blend into the base metals, resulting in a weak weld and a risk of cracking at the edge of the bead. Weaving constantly moves the fusion zone around so as to limit the amount of metal deposited at any one point. Surface tension then assists in keeping the molten metal in the puddle until it is able to solidify. In some cases, a higher-than-normal shielding gas flow rate may be required to achieve a satisfactory weld. Development of position-welding skill takes experience, but is usually mastered by most welding apprentices before reaching journeyman status.

A vertical weld may start at the bottom of the joint and proceed upwards, or start at the top and work downwards. The bottom-up technique tends to produce deeper penetration and a theoretically-stronger weld. However, there is an increased tendency for weld drip, leading to the aforementioned cratering and undercutting, avoidable with a proper weaving technique. Some increase in spatter may also be an issue. On the other hand, the top-down procedure is less prone to weld drip, and generally produces smoother and more-attractive welds, but with less penetration. Bottom-up is generally considered the preferred technique with heavy sections, although use of pure carbon dioxide when welding low- and medium-carbon steels with the top-down technique can increase penetration without excessive appearance degradation.

As well as possessing good gun-handling skills, the welder must know how to correctly configure the welding machine to suit the characteristics of the weldment, the wire type and shielding gas(es) being used, and in some cases, the orientation of the joint to be welded. Such configuration involves setting voltage, wire-feed speed and gas-flow rate, as well as using the correct gun nozzle to achieve proper shielding gas dispersal.

Over time, welding will cause a buildup of spatter inside the nozzle, which in sufficient quantity, will affect gas dispersal, possibly leading to unsound welds. Hence the welder will have to periodically clean the nozzle and tip to remove spatter. Use of anti-spatter compound on the nozzle and tip can often slow the rate of buildup. Anti-spatter compound is sold both in a jar as a paste (often referred to in the trade as "tip-dip"), and in an aerosol can as a spray. Welders may use the latter product to prevent spatter buildup on the weldment itself, as well as on the jig that is holding the weldment components.

=== Quality ===
Two of the most prevalent quality problems in GMAW are dross and porosity. If not controlled, they can lead to weaker, less ductile welds. Dross is an especially common problem in aluminium GMAW welds, normally coming from particles of aluminium oxide or aluminum nitride present in the electrode or base materials. Electrodes and workpieces must be brushed with a wire brush or chemically treated to remove oxides on the surface. Any oxygen in contact with the weld pool, whether from the atmosphere or the shielding gas, causes dross as well. As a result, sufficient flow of inert shielding gases is necessary, and welding in moving air should be avoided.

In GMAW the primary cause of porosity is gas entrapment in the weld pool, which occurs when the metal solidifies before the gas escapes. The gas can come from impurities in the shielding gas or on the workpiece, as well as from an excessively long or violent arc. Generally, the amount of gas entrapped is directly related to the cooling rate of the weld pool. Because of its higher thermal conductivity, aluminum welds are especially susceptible to greater cooling rates and thus additional porosity. To reduce it, the workpiece and electrode should be clean, the welding speed diminished and the current set high enough to provide sufficient heat input and stable metal transfer but low enough that the arc remains steady. Preheating can also help reduce the cooling rate in some cases by reducing the temperature gradient between the weld area and the base metal.

=== Safety ===
Arc welding in any form can be dangerous if proper precautions are not taken. Since GMAW employs an electric arc, welders must wear suitable protective clothing, including heavy gloves and protective long sleeve jackets, to minimize exposure to the arc itself, as well as intense heat, sparks and hot metal. The intense ultraviolet radiation of the arc may cause sunburn-like damage to exposed skin, as well a condition known as arc eye, an inflammation of the cornea, or in cases of prolonged exposure, irreversible damage to the eye's retina. Conventional welding helmets contain dark face plates to prevent this exposure. Newer helmet designs feature a liquid crystal-type face plate that self-darkens upon exposure to the arc. Transparent welding curtains, made of a polyvinyl chloride plastic film, are often used to shield nearby workers and bystanders from exposure to the arc.

Welders are often exposed to hazardous gases and airborne particulate matter. GMAW produces smoke containing particles of various types of oxides, and the size of the particles tends to influence the toxicity of the fumes. Smaller particles present greater danger. Concentrations of carbon dioxide and ozone can prove dangerous if ventilation is inadequate. Other precautions include keeping combustible materials away from the workplace, and having a working fire extinguisher nearby.

== Metal transfer modes ==
The three transfer modes in GMAW are globular, short-circuiting, and spray. There are a few recognized variations of these three transfer modes including modified short-circuiting and pulsed-spray.

=== Globular ===
GMAW with globular metal transfer is considered the least desirable of the three major GMAW variations, because of its tendency to produce high heat, a poor weld surface, and spatter. The method was originally developed as a cost efficient way to weld steel using GMAW, because this variation uses carbon dioxide, a less expensive shielding gas than argon. Adding to its economic advantage was its high deposition rate, allowing welding speeds of up to 110 mm/s (250 in/min). As the weld is made, a ball of molten metal from the electrode tends to build up on the end of the electrode, often in irregular shapes with a larger diameter than the electrode itself. When the droplet finally detaches either by gravity or short circuiting, it falls to the workpiece, leaving an uneven surface and often causing spatter. As a result of the large molten droplet, the process is generally limited to flat and horizontal welding positions, requires thicker workpieces, and results in a larger weld pool.

=== Short-circuiting ===
Further developments in welding steel with GMAW led to a variation known as short-circuit transfer (SCT) or short-arc GMAW, in which the current is lower than for the globular method. As a result of the lower current, the heat input for the short-arc variation is considerably reduced, making it possible to weld thinner materials while decreasing the amount of distortion and residual stress in the weld area. As in globular welding, molten droplets form on the tip of the electrode, but instead of dropping to the weld pool, they bridge the gap between the electrode and the weld pool as a result of the lower wire feed rate. This causes a short circuit and extinguishes the arc, but it is quickly reignited after the surface tension of the weld pool pulls the molten metal bead off the electrode tip. This process is repeated about 100 times per second, making the arc appear constant to the human eye. This type of metal transfer provides better weld quality and less spatter than the globular variation, and allows for welding in all positions, albeit with slower deposition of weld material. Setting the weld process parameters (volts, amps and wire feed rate) within a relatively narrow band is critical to maintaining a stable arc: generally between 100 and 200 amperes at 17 to 22 volts for most applications. Also, using short-arc transfer can result in lack of fusion and insufficient penetration when welding thicker materials, due to the lower arc energy and rapidly freezing weld pool. Like the globular variation, it can only be used on ferrous metals.

=== Spray ===
Spray transfer GMAW was the first metal transfer method used in GMAW, and well-suited to welding aluminium and stainless steel while employing an inert shielding gas. In this GMAW process, the weld electrode metal is rapidly passed along the stable electric arc from the electrode to the workpiece, essentially eliminating spatter and resulting in a high-quality weld finish. As the current and voltage increases beyond the range of short circuit transfer the weld electrode metal transfer transitions from larger globules through small droplets to a vaporized stream at the highest energies. Since this vaporized spray transfer variation of the GMAW weld process requires higher voltage and current than short circuit transfer, and as a result of the higher heat input and larger weld pool area (for a given weld electrode diameter), it is generally used only on workpieces of thicknesses above about 6.4 mm (0.25 in).

Also, because of the large weld pool, it is often limited to flat and horizontal welding positions and sometimes also used for vertical-down welds. It is generally not practical for root pass welds. When a smaller electrode is used in conjunction with lower heat input, its versatility increases. The maximum deposition rate for spray arc GMAW is relatively high—about 600 mm/s (1500 in/min).

=== Pulsed-spray ===
A variation of the spray transfer mode, pulse-spray is based on the principles of spray transfer but uses a pulsing current to melt the filler wire and allow one small molten droplet to fall with each pulse. The pulses allow the average current to be lower, decreasing the overall heat input and thereby decreasing the size of the weld pool and heat-affected zone while making it possible to weld thin workpieces. The pulse provides a stable arc and no spatter, since no short-circuiting takes place. This also makes the process suitable for nearly all metals, and thicker electrode wire can be used as well. The smaller weld pool gives the variation greater versatility, making it possible to weld in all positions. In comparison with short arc GMAW, this method has a somewhat slower maximum speed (85 mm/s or 200 in/min) and the process also requires that the shielding gas be primarily argon with a low carbon dioxide concentration. Additionally, it requires a special power source capable of providing current pulses with a frequency between 30 and 400 pulses per second. However, the method has gained popularity, since it requires lower heat input and can be used to weld thin workpieces, as well as nonferrous materials.

== Comparison with flux-cored wire-fed arc welding ==
Flux-cored, self-shielding or gasless wire-fed welding had been developed for simplicity and portability. These gasless machines operate as DCEN, rather than the DCEP usually used for GMAW solid wire. DCEP, or DC electrode positive, makes the welding wire into the positively charged anode, which is the hotter side of the arc. Flux-cored wire is considered to have some advantages for outdoor welding on-site, as the shielding gas plume is less likely to be blown away in a wind than shield gas from a conventional nozzle. A slight drawback is that, like SMAW (stick) welding, there may be some flux deposited over the weld bead, requiring more of a cleaning process between passes.

Flux-cored welding machines are most popular at the hobbyist level, as the machines are slightly simpler but mainly because they avoid the cost of providing shield gas, either through a rented cylinder or with the high cost of disposable cylinders.

== See also ==
- List of welding processes

== Bibliography ==
- American Welding Society (2004). Welding Handbook, Welding Processes, Part 1. Miami: American Welding Society. ISBN 978-0-87171-729-0.
- Anders, A. (2003). "Tracking down the origin of arc plasma science-II. early continuous discharges" (PDF). IEEE Transactions on Plasma Science. 31 (5): 1060–9. Bibcode:2003ITPS...31.1060A. doi:10.1109/TPS.2003.815477. OSTI 823202. S2CID 11047670.
- Cary, Howard B.; Helzer, Scott C. (2005). Modern Welding Technology. Upper Saddle River, New Jersey: Pearson Education. ISBN 978-0-13-113029-6.
- Craig, Ed (1991). Gas Metal Arc & Flux Cored Welding Parameters. Chicago: Weldtrain. ISBN 978-0-9753621-0-5.
- Davies, Arthur Cyril (2003). The Science and Practice of Welding. Cambridge University Press. ISBN 978-0-521-43566-6.
- Jeffus, Larry F. (1997). Welding: Principles and Applications. Cengage Learning. ISBN 978-08-2738-240-4.
- Kalpakjian, Serope; Schmid, Steven R. (2001). Manufacturing Engineering and Technology. Prentice Hall. ISBN 978-0-201-36131-5.
- Lincoln Electric (1994). The Procedure Handbook of Arc Welding. Cleveland: Lincoln Electric. ISBN 978-99949-25-82-7.
- Miller Electric Mfg Co (2012). Guidelines For Gas Metal Arc Welding (GMAW) (PDF). Appleton, WI: Miller Electric Mfg Co. Archived from the original (PDF) on 2015-12-08.
- Nadzam, Jeff, ed. (1997). Gas Metal Arc Welding Guidelines (PDF). Lincoln Electric. Archived from the original (PDF) on 2015-07-01.
- Todd, Robert H.; Allen, Dell K.; Alting, Leo (1994). Manufacturing processes reference guide. New York: Industrial Press. ISBN 978-0-8311-3049-7.
- Weman, Klas (2003). Welding processes handbook. New York: CRC Press LLC. ISBN 978-0-8493-1773-6.
