= Arc blow =

Unwanted deflection of the arc in welding

Arc blow is the, usually unwanted, deflection of the arc during arc welding.

There are two types of arc blow commonly known in the electric welding industry: magnetic and thermal.

== Magnetic arc blow ==
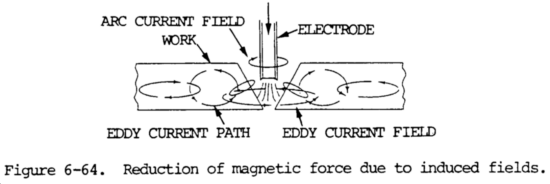
Eddy currents in an arc blow cross-section.

Magnetic arc blow or "arc wander" is the deflection of welding filler material within an electric arc deposit by a buildup of magnetic force surrounding the weld pool. Magnetic arc blow can occur because of:

- Workpiece connection
- Joint design
- Poor fit-up
- Improper settings
- Atmospheric conditions

Arc blow tends to occur if the material being welded has residual magnetism at a certain level, particularly when the weld root is being made, and the welding current is direct current (DC positive or negative).

Magnetic arc blow is popularly attributed to a change in the direction of current as it flows into and through the workpiece. Magnetic arc blow is known to begin at field densities as low as 10 gauss and becomes severe at densities of, equal to or greater than, 40 gauss; it is directional and can be classified as forward or backward moving along the joint, but can occasionally occur to the sides depending on the orientation of the poles to the workpiece.

Magnetic arc blow is more common in DC welding than in AC welding.

== Thermal arc blow ==
Thermal arc blow is widely attributed to variations in resistance within the base metal created by the weld pool as it is moved across the workpiece. Thermal arc blow can occur because of:

- Improper surface preparation
- Improper travel speed

Thermal arc blow is not as severe as magnetic arc blow, but can still leave undesirable defects in the weld deposit.
