= Firecracker welding =

Uncommon welding technique

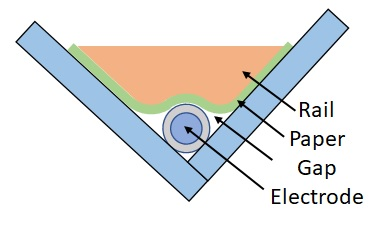
Firecracker welding

Firecracker welding is a rarely used form of shielded metal arc welding (SMAW).

A flux-coated electrode, as used for SMAW (manual stick welding), is laid horizontally above a close-fitting butt weld. An arc is struck at one end of the electrode, which then burns along the length of the electrode. The electrode is held in place by either copper blocks, clamps or adhesive tape.

== Process ==
Manual metal arc welding is relatively slow, as much time is spent stopping to fit new electrodes and to clean slag before restarting. Firecracker welding allows a weld the entire length of an electrode to be welded in one pass, without pausing. Extra-long electrodes may be used to increase the length that may be welded in one pass, up to 72 inches (1.8 meters).

The need to clean slag from a manual weld before restarting increases the risk of accidental slag inclusion in the finished weld. This risk is avoided through the use of firecracker welding. As the electrode position is also constant relative to the weld, the risk of porosity is also reduced, to the level of a skilled welder. The process is also suitable for use in areas with limited access. Once started it continues automatically, without needing enough space for a skilled welder with sight of the weld.

One drawback is that the size of the bead deposited is limited by the cross-section of the electrode, as there is no scope for manually weaving the arc to deposit more rod in less weld length. For this reason, the flux coating often contains iron powder, to give additional deposition. The rod coating is generally the same as for manual arc, with no change being required. Experiments have been conducted where the coating was thinned on the side in contact with the workpiece, although this does not seem to show a great advantage.

== History of application ==
The process was developed in Austria in 1938 by Georg Hafergut. The process was known as Elin-Hafergut welding.

The process, with its suitability for long welds in flat sheet was recognised as being useful for shipbuilding and bridgebuilding and has been studied specifically for these applications.

== Advantages and disadvantages ==
=== Advantages ===
- The process is semi-automated
- The equipment required is simple and cheap, the same as for manual arc.
- Welding is quicker than manual arc, as electrode changing is reduced.
- Porosity and slag inclusion of the finished weld is reduced, as electrode positioning is consistent and accurate.
- The process can be applied in inaccessible areas, with poor visibility, and with less operator skill.

=== Disadvantages ===
- The one-pass bead is limited in cross section to that of the original electrode, i.e. there is no opportunity for weaving. Multiple passes are not generally used.
- The process is limited to straight welds in horizontal position.

== See also ==
- Yablochkov candle
