= Shielding gas =

Gases commonly used in several welding processes

Shielding gases are inert or semi-inert gases that are commonly used in several welding processes, most notably gas metal arc welding and gas tungsten arc welding (GMAW and GTAW, more popularly known as MIG (Metal Inert Gas) and TIG (Tungsten Inert Gas), respectively). Their purpose is to protect the weld area from oxygen and water vapour. Depending on the materials being welded, these atmospheric gases can reduce the quality of the weld or make the welding more difficult. Other arc welding processes use alternative methods of protecting the weld from the atmosphere as well – shielded metal arc welding, for example, uses an electrode covered in a flux that produces carbon dioxide when consumed, a semi-inert gas that is an acceptable shielding gas for welding steel.

Improper choice of a welding gas can lead to a porous and weak weld, or to excessive spatter; the latter, while not affecting the weld itself, causes loss of productivity due to the labor needed to remove the scattered drops.

If used carelessly, shielding gasses can displace oxygen, causing hypoxia and potentially death.

== Common shielding gases ==
Shielding gases fall into two categories—inert or semi-inert. Only two of the noble gases, helium and argon, are cost effective enough to be used in welding. These inert gases are used in gas tungsten arc welding, and also in gas metal arc welding for the welding of non-ferrous metals. Semi-inert shielding gases, or active shield gases, include carbon dioxide, oxygen, nitrogen, and hydrogen. These active gases are used with GMAW on ferrous metals. Most of these gases, in large quantities, would damage the weld, but when used in small, controlled quantities, can improve weld characteristics.

== Properties ==
The important properties of shielding gases are their thermal conductivity and heat transfer properties, their density relative to air, and the ease with which they undergo ionization. Gases heavier than air (e.g. argon) blanket the weld and require lower flow rates than gases lighter than air (e.g. helium). Heat transfer is important for heating the weld around the arc. Ionizability influences how easy the arc starts, and how high voltage is required. Shielding gases can be used pure, or as a blend of two or three gases. In laser welding, the shielding gas has an additional role, preventing formation of a cloud of plasma above the weld, absorbing significant fraction of the laser energy. This is important for CO_{2} lasers; Nd:YAG lasers show lower tendency to form such plasma. Helium plays this role best due to its high ionization potential; the gas can absorb high amount of energy before becoming ionized.

Argon is the most common shielding gas, widely used as the base for the more specialized gas mixes.

Carbon dioxide is the least expensive shielding gas, providing deep penetration, however it negatively affects the stability of the arc and enhances the molten metal's tendency to create droplets (spatter). Carbon dioxide in concentration of 1-2% is commonly used in the mix with argon to reduce the surface tension of the molten metal. Another common blend is 25% carbon dioxide and 75% argon for GMAW.

Helium is lighter than air; larger flow rates are required. It is an inert gas, not reacting with the molten metals. Its thermal conductivity is high. It is not easy to ionize, requiring higher voltage to start the arc. Due to higher ionization potential it produces hotter arc at higher voltage, provides wide deep bead; this is an advantage for aluminium, magnesium, and copper alloys. Other gases are often added. Blends of helium with addition of 5–10% of argon and 2–5% of carbon dioxide ("tri-mix") can be used for welding of stainless steel. Used also for aluminium and other non-ferrous metals, especially for thicker welds. In comparison with argon, helium provides more energy-rich but less stable arc. Helium and carbon dioxide were the first shielding gases used, since the beginning of World War 2. Helium is used as a shield gas in laser welding for carbon dioxide lasers. Helium is more expensive than argon and requires higher flow rates, so despite its advantages it may not be a cost-effective choice for higher-volume production. Pure helium is not used for steel, as it causes an erratic arc and encourages spatter.

Oxygen is used in small amounts as an addition to other gases; typically as 2–5% addition to argon. It enhances arc stability and reduces the surface tension of the molten metal, increasing wetting of the solid metal. It is used for spray transfer welding of mild carbon steels, low alloy and stainless steels. Its presence increases the amount of slag. Argon-oxygen (Ar-O_{2}) blends are often being replaced with argon-carbon dioxide ones. Argon-carbon dioxide-oxygen blends are also used. Oxygen causes oxidation of the weld, so it is not suitable for welding aluminium, magnesium, copper, and some exotic metals. Increased oxygen makes the shielding gas oxidize the electrode, which can lead to porosity in the deposit if the electrode does not contain sufficient deoxidizers. Excessive oxygen, especially when used in application for which it is not prescribed, can lead to brittleness in the heat affected zone. Argon-oxygen blends with 1–2% oxygen are used for austenitic stainless steel where argon-CO_{2} can not be used due to required low content of carbon in the weld; the weld has a tough oxide coating and may require cleaning.

Hydrogen is used for welding of nickel and some stainless steels, especially thicker pieces. It improves the molten metal fluidity, and enhances cleanness of the surface. It is added to argon in amounts typically under 10%. It can be added to argon-carbon dioxide blends to counteract the oxidizing effects of carbon dioxide. Its addition narrows the arc and increases the arc temperature, leading to better weld penetration. In higher concentrations (up to 25% hydrogen), it may be used for welding conductive materials such as copper. However, it should not be used on steel, aluminum or magnesium because it can cause porosity and hydrogen embrittlement; its application is usually limited only to some stainless steels.

Nitric oxide addition serves to reduce production of ozone. It can also stabilize the arc when welding aluminium and high-alloyed stainless steel.

Other gases can be used for special applications, pure or as blend additives; e.g. sulfur hexafluoride or dichlorodifluoromethane.

Sulfur hexafluoride can be added to shield gas for aluminium welding to bind hydrogen in the weld area to reduce weld porosity.

Dichlorodifluoromethane with argon can be used for protective atmosphere for melting of aluminium-lithium alloys. It reduces the content of hydrogen in the aluminium weld, preventing the associated porosity. This gas, however, is being used less because it has a strong ozone depletion potential.

=== Common mixes ===
- Argon-carbon dioxide
  - C-50 (50% argon/50% CO_{2}) is used for short arc welding of pipes,
  - C-40 (60% argon/40% CO_{2}) is used for some flux-cored arc welding cases. Better weld penetration than C-25.
  - C-25 (75% argon/25% CO_{2}) is commonly used by hobbyists and in small-scale production. Limited to short circuit and globular transfer welding. Common for short-circuit gas metal arc welding of low carbon steel.
  - C-20 (80% argon/20% CO_{2}) is used for short-circuiting and spray transfer of carbon steel.
  - C-15 (85% argon/15% CO_{2}) is common in production environment for carbon and low alloy steels. Has lower spatter and good weld penetration, suitable for thicker plates and steel significantly covered with mill scale. Suitable for short circuit, globular, pulse and spray transfer welding. Maximum productivity for thin metals in short-circuiting mode; has lower tendency to burn through than higher-CO_{2} mixes and has suitably high deposition rates.
  - C-10 (90% argon/10% CO_{2}) is common in production environment. Has low spatter and good weld penetration, though lower than C-15; suitable for many steels. Same applications as 85/15 mix. Sufficient for ferritic stainless steels.
  - C-5 (95% argon/5% CO_{2}) is used for pulse spray transfer and short-circuiting of low alloy steel. Has better tolerance for mill scale and better puddle control than argon-oxygen, though less than C-10. Less heat than C-10. Sufficient for ferritic stainless steels. Similar performance to argon with 1% oxygen.
- Argon-oxygen
  - O-5 (95% argon/5% oxygen) is the most common gas for general carbon steel welding. Higher oxygen content allows higher speed of welding. More than 5% oxygen makes the shielding gas oxidize the electrode, which can lead to porosity in the deposit if the electrode does not contain sufficient deoxidizers.
  - O-2 (98% argon/2% oxygen) is used for spray arc on stainless steel, carbon steels, and low alloy steels. Better wetting than O-1. Weld is darker and more oxidized than with O-1. The addition of 2% oxygen encourages spray transfer, which is critical for spray-arc and pulsed spray-arc GMAW.
  - O-1 (99% argon/1% oxygen) is used for stainless steels. Oxygen stabilizes the arc.
- Argon-helium
  - A-25 (25% argon/75% helium) is used for nonferrous base when higher heat input and good weld appearance are needed.
  - A-50 (50% argon/50% helium) is used for nonferrous metals thinner than 0.75 inch for high-speed mechanized welding.
  - A-75 (75% argon/25% helium) is used for mechanized welding of thick aluminium. Reduces weld porosity in copper.
- Argon-hydrogen
  - H-2 (98% argon/2% hydrogen)
  - H-5 (95% argon/5% hydrogen)
  - H-10 (80% argon/20% hydrogen)
  - H-35 (65% argon/35% hydrogen)
- Others
  - Argon with 25–35% helium and 1–2% CO_{2} provides high productivity and good welds on austenitic stainless steels. Can be used for joining stainless steel to carbon steel.
  - Argon-CO_{2} with 1–2% hydrogen provides a reducing atmosphere that lowers amount of oxide on the weld surface, improves wetting and penetration. Good for austenitic stainless steels.
  - Argon with 2–5% nitrogen and 2–5% CO_{2} in short-circuiting yields good weld shape and color and increases welding speed. For spray and pulsed spray transfer it is nearly equivalent to other mixes. When joining stainless to carbon steels in presence of nitrogen, care has to be taken to ensure the proper weld microstructure. Nitrogen increases arc stability and penetration and reduces distortion of the welded part. In duplex stainless steels assists in maintaining proper nitrogen content.
  - 85–95% helium with 5–10% argon and 2–5% CO_{2} is an industry standard for short-circuit welding of carbon steel.
  - Argon – carbon dioxide – oxygen
  - Argon–helium–hydrogen
  - Argon – helium – hydrogen – carbon dioxide

== Applications ==
The applications of shielding gases are limited primarily by the cost of the gas, the cost of the equipment, and by the location of the welding. Some shielding gases, like argon, are expensive, limiting its use. The equipment used for the delivery of the gas is also an added cost, and as a result, processes like shielded metal arc welding, which require less expensive equipment, might be preferred in certain situations. Finally, because atmospheric movements can cause the dispersion of the shielding gas around the weld, welding processes that require shielding gases are often only done indoors, where the environment is stable and atmospheric gases can be effectively prevented from entering the weld area.

The desirable rate of gas flow depends primarily on weld geometry, speed, current, the type of gas, and the metal transfer mode being utilized. Welding flat surfaces requires higher flow than welding grooved materials, since the gas is dispersed more quickly. Faster welding speeds, in general, mean that more gas needs to be supplied to provide adequate coverage. Additionally, higher current requires greater flow, and generally, more helium is required to provide adequate coverage than argon. Perhaps most importantly, the four primary variations of GMAW have differing shielding gas flow requirements—for the small weld pools of the short circuiting and pulsed spray modes, about 10 L/min (20 ft^{3}/h) is generally suitable, while for globular transfer, around 15 L/min (30 ft^{3}/h) is preferred. The spray transfer variation normally requires more because of its higher heat input and thus larger weld pool; along the lines of 20–25 L/min (40–50 ft^{3}/h).

== See also ==
- Forming gas
