= Yablochkov candle =

Type of electric carbon arc lamp

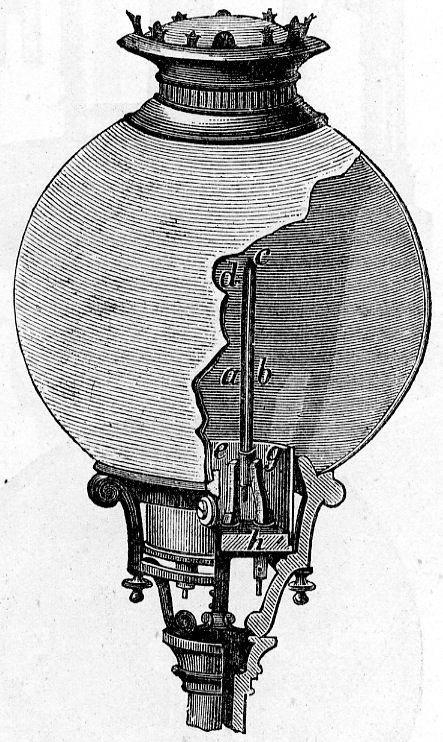
Yablochkov candle with part of the bulb removed to show the two parallel carbon rods separated slightly from each other by a layer of plaster of Paris.

A Yablochkov candle (sometimes electric candle or Jablochkoff candle) is a type of electric carbon arc lamp, invented in 1876 by the Russian electrical engineer Pavel Yablochkov.

== Design ==
A Yablochkov candle consists of a sandwich of two electrodes, which are long carbon rods, approximately 6 by 12 millimetres in cross-section, separated by a block of inert and insulating material such as plaster of Paris or kaolin. There is a small piece of fuse wire or carbon paste linking the two carbon rods at the top end. The assembly is mounted vertically into a suitable insulated holder.

On application of the electric supply, the fuse wire "blows" and strikes the arc. The arc then continues to burn, gradually consuming the carbon electrodes and the intervening plaster, which melts at the same pace. The first candles were powered by a Gramme machine. The drawback of using direct current was that one of the rods would burn at twice the rate of the other. This problem was initially solved by preparing the sandwich with one of the rods thicker than the other, but this solution was not practicable. The problem was eventually solved by powering the candles with alternating current which burned the two rods at the same speed.

The electrodes last about two hours or until the power is cut. A classic Yablochkov candle cannot be relit, since the fuse wire between the electrodes has been consumed. Later versions of the candle, however, included powdered metal in the inert separator. This would act as a new fuse wire, allowing a half-burnt candle to be restarted once extinguished. The advantage of this design over other carbon arc designs is that it removes the need for a mechanical regulator to maintain the appropriate distance between the carbon electrodes to sustain the arc.

In his trials to power more sets of candles with different light flux and in order to obtain different voltages, Yablochkov invented the first transformers.

As any other carbon arc lamps, Yablochkov candles have a very bright light that can be used for lighting large lengths of streets or large interiors such as factories and train stations and its use as a street lighting system was cheaper than oil lamps. The disadvantages of these lamps are related to a short duration, which implied replacing them after short periods of time. When lit they produce buzzing noise, dangerous UV rays, carbon monoxide emissions and radio frequency interference. During use they were a constant fire hazard principally due to sparks and high operating temperature.

== History ==
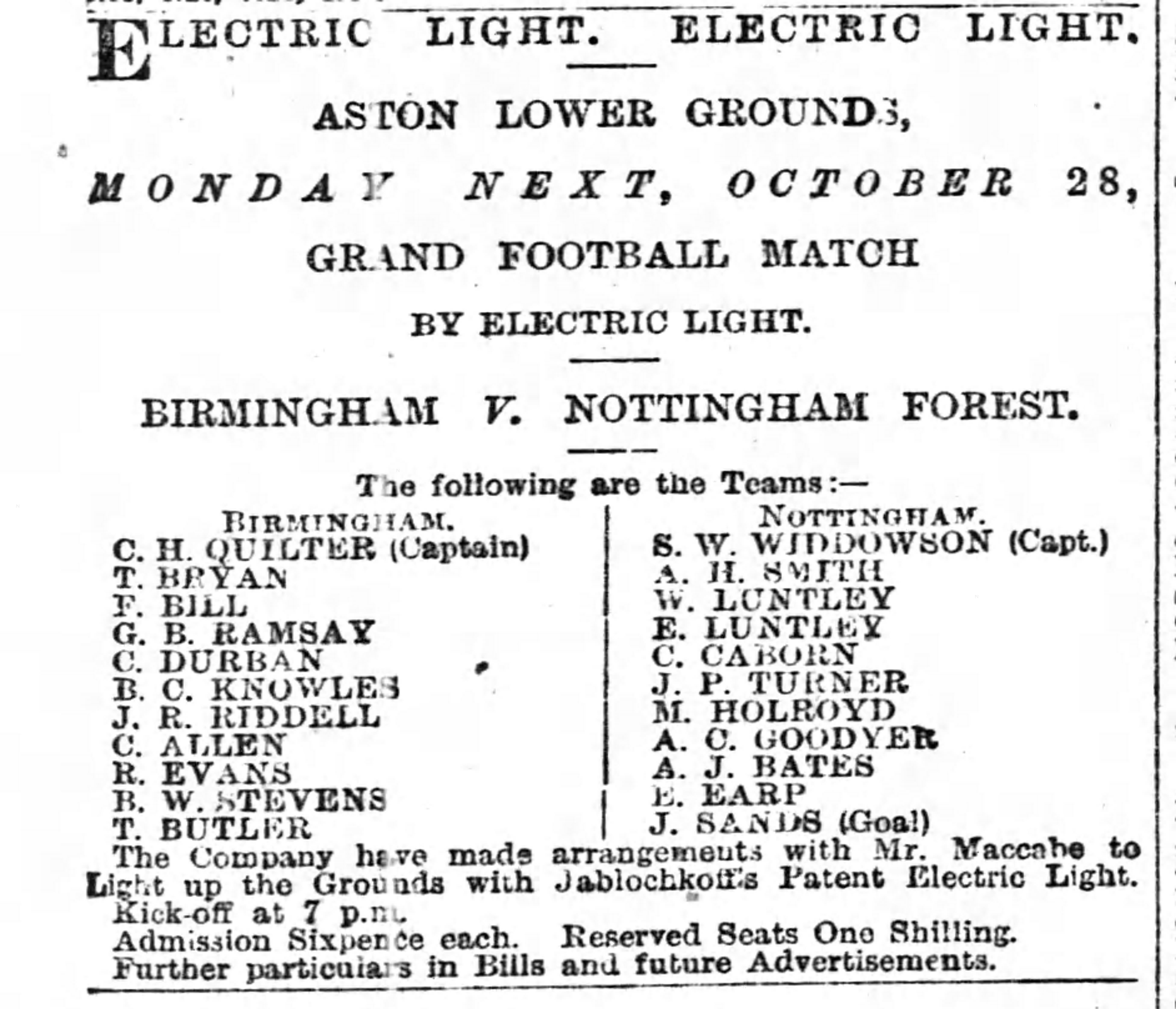
Advert for floodlit football match between Birmingham Football Club and Nottingham Forest, Birmingham Daily Post, 25 October 1878

In 1875 Yablochkov left Russia and started his Paris business; by 1876 he was granted the French patent 112024 for his candles. The first public experiment was held in London on April 15, 1876. The Yablochkov candles were first used commercially in 1877 in the Marengo hall of the department store Galeries du Louvre in Paris with an installation of 80 lamps. Their presence is mentioned by Émile Zola in his novel Au Bonheur des dames (Ladies paradise). In this occasion Paris was nicknamed city of lights.

They were first demonstrated as street illumination during the Paris Exhibition of 1878, notably on the Avenue de l'Opéra, in Place du Theatre Français (now Place André Malraux) and in Place de l'Opéra. The 64 lamps had four to twelve candles each, connected in series and were enclosed in globes of enamelled glass. In December of the same year Yablochkov candles were installed along the Victoria Embankment in London.

Werner von Siemens visited the 1878 Paris Exhibition and negotiated to become a distribution agent for the candles in Germany; in return he delivered dynamo machines to Yablochkov. The candles were soon used in many European cities but also in other continents: cities such as Rio de Janeiro, Mexico City, New Delhi, Calcutta, and Madras were using them. The Shah of Persia and the King of Cambodia used the candles for their palaces.

The candles were successfully used aboard the French ironclad Amiral Duperré, launched in 1879.

In 1881 at the International Exposition of Electricity the Yablochkov candles were regarded as one of the main attractions. At that time their cost was estimated to have dropped from 66 cents (of French francs) in 1877 to just 10 cents, making them very convenient also with respect to gas lamps. The main drawback was that the candles needed a big power machine in order to be lit.

At the height of their success 8,000 candles per day were produced in France.

== Gallery ==
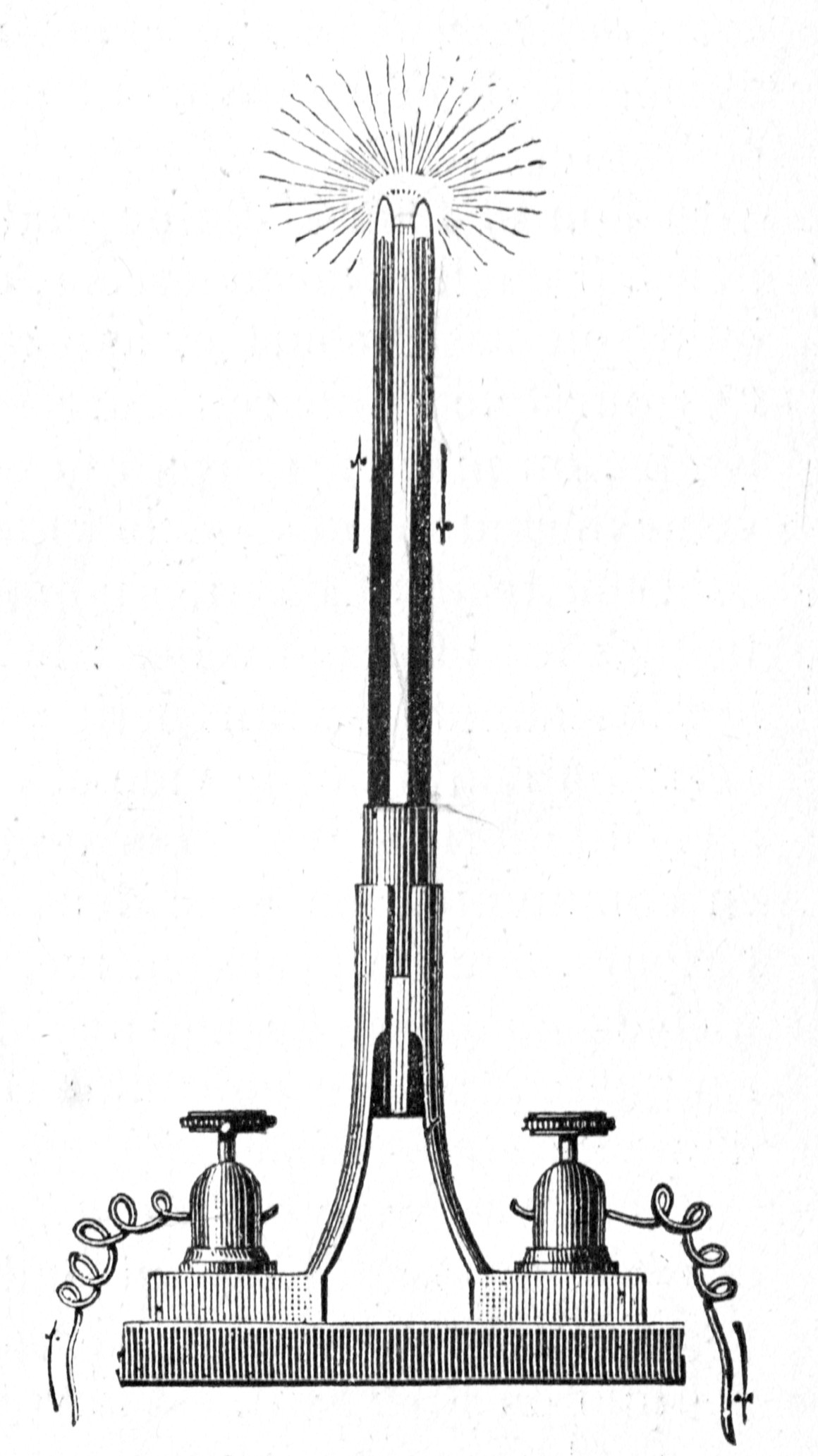
Yablochkov candle for AC current from C.Haraucourt elementary physics course page 265 published in 1892

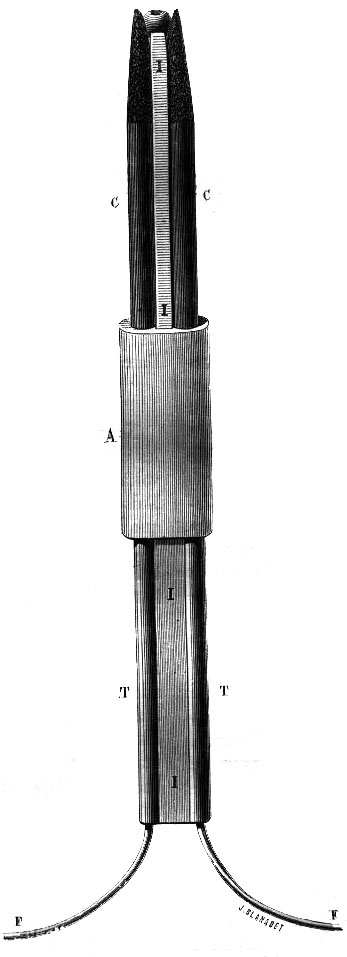
Yablochkov candle without bulb. Illustration from La Nature (1877).

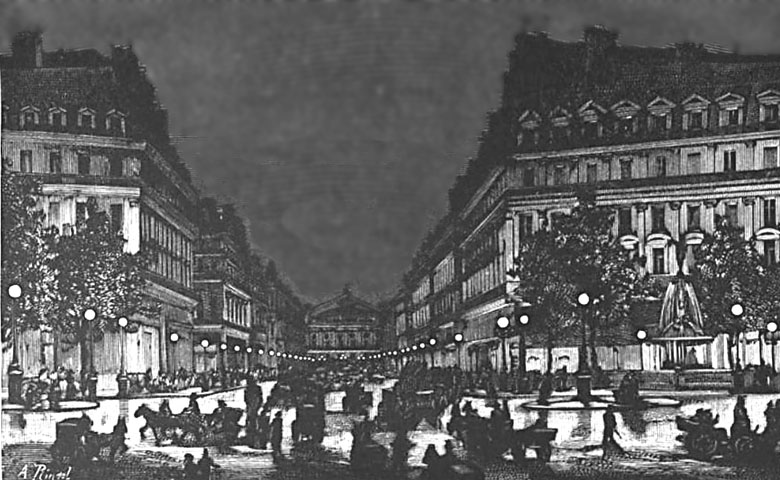
Yablochkov candles illuminating Avenue de l'Opéra in Paris under the Exposition Universelle (1878).

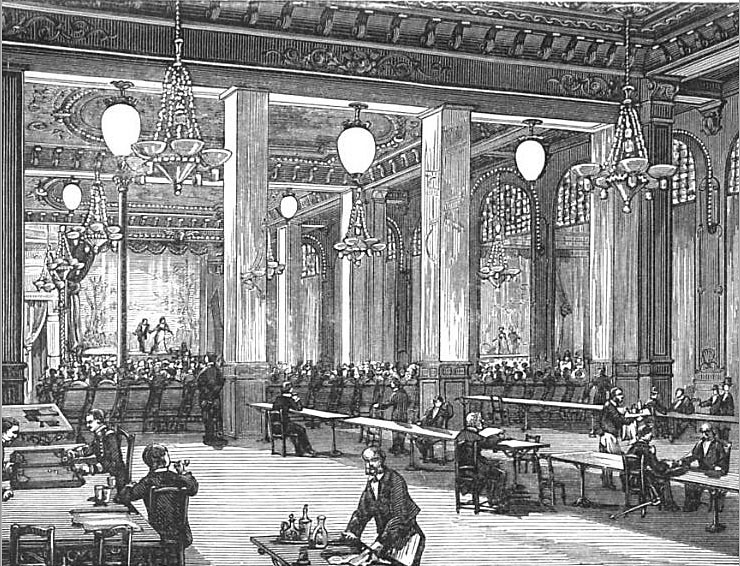
Yablochkov candles in Music hall at Place du Château d'Eau in Paris, c. 1880

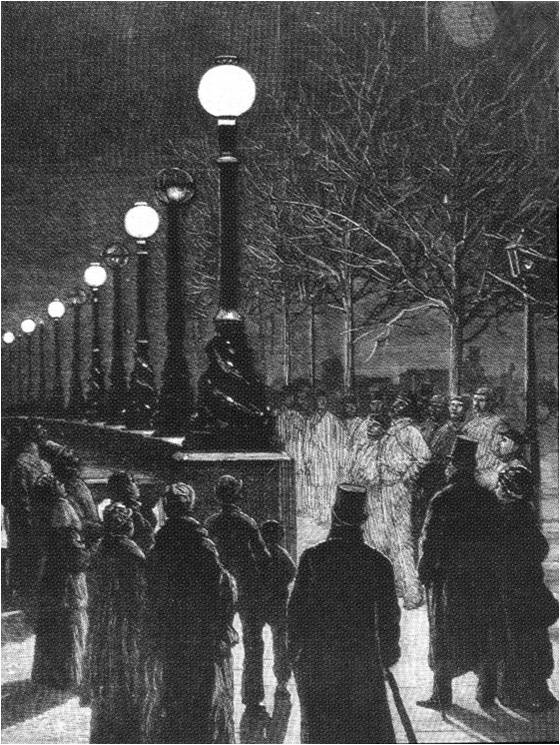
Yablochkov candles installed at Victoria Embankment in London, December 1878

== See also ==
- List of light sources
- List of Russian inventions
- Firecracker welding
