= Welding power supply =

Piece of equipment used to weld

Welding Power Supply
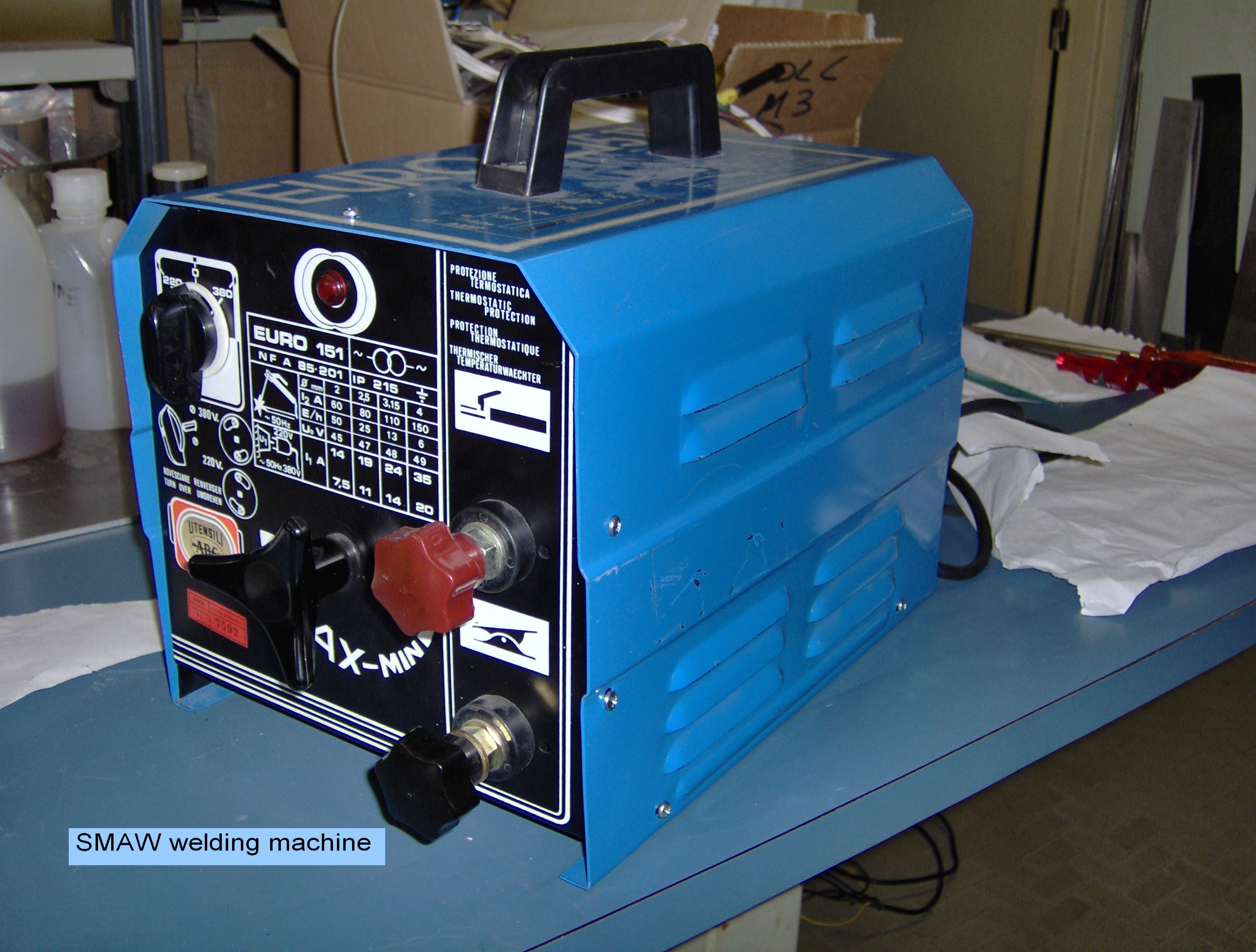
- Alternating current coated electrode welding machine.

A welding power supply is a device that provides or modulates an electric current to perform arc welding. There are multiple arc welding processes ranging from Shielded Metal Arc Welding (SMAW) to inert shielding gas like Gas metal arc welding (GMAW) or Gas tungsten arc welding (GTAW). Welding power supplies primarily serve as devices that allow a welder to exercise control over whether current is alternating current (AC) or direct current (DC), as well as the amount of current and voltage.

Power supplies for welding processes that use shielding gas also offer connections for gas and methods to control gas flow. The operator can set these factors to within the parameters as needed by the metal type, thickness, and technique to be used. The majority of welding power supplies do not generate power, instead functioning as controllable transformers that allow the operator to adjust electrical properties as needed. However, in some welding applications, notably SMAW, used in areas isolated from power grids, welding power supplies are used that combine the functions of electrical generation and current modulation into a single mobile unit mounted on a vehicle or towed trailer.

== Classification ==
Welding machines are usually classified as constant current (CC) or constant voltage (CV); a constant current machine varies its output voltage to maintain a steady current while a constant voltage machine will fluctuate its output current to maintain a set voltage. Shielded metal arc welding and gas tungsten arc welding will use a constant current source and gas metal arc welding and flux-cored arc welding typically use constant voltage sources but constant current is also possible with a voltage sensing wire feeder.

Constant current sources are used for welding operation which are performed manually like Shielded Metal Arc Welding or Gas Tungsten Arc Welding. Being manual processes, the arc length is not constant throughout the operation. This is attributed to the fact that it requires very high amount of skill to keep the hand at exactly same position above the workpiece throughout the welding. Using a constant current source makes sure that even if the arc length changes, which causes a change in arc voltage, the welding current is not changed by much and the heat input into the weld zone remains more or less constant throughout operation.

The nature of the CV machine is required by gas metal arc welding and flux-cored arc welding because the welder is not able to control the arc length manually. If a welder were to attempt to use a CV machine for a shielded metal arc welding (SMAW) task, the small fluctuations in the arc distance would cause significant fluctuations in the machine's current output. With a CC machine the welder can count on a fixed number of amps reaching the material, regardless of how short or long the electric arc gets.

== Power supply designs ==
The welding power supplies most commonly seen can be categorized within the following types:

=== Transformer ===
A transformer-style welding power supply converts the moderate voltage and moderate current electricity from the utility mains (typically 230 or 115 VAC) into a high current and low voltage supply, typically between 17 and 45 (open-circuit) volts and 55 to 590 amperes. A rectifier converts the AC into DC on more expensive machines.

This design typically allows the welder to select the output current by variously moving a primary winding closer or farther from a secondary winding, moving a magnetic shunt in and out of the core of the transformer, using a series saturating reactor with a variable saturating technique in series with the secondary current output, or by simply permitting the welder to select the output voltage from a set of taps on the transformer's secondary winding. These transformer style machines are typically the least expensive.

The trade off for the reduced expense is that pure transformer designs are often bulky and massive because they operate at the utility mains frequency of 50 or 60 Hz. Such low frequency transformers must have a high magnetizing inductance to avoid wasteful shunt currents. The transformer may also have significant leakage inductance for short circuit protection in the event of a welding rod becoming stuck to the workpiece. The leakage inductance may be variable so the operator can set the output current.

=== Generator and alternator ===
Welding power supplies may also use generators or alternators to convert mechanical energy into electrical energy. Modern designs are usually driven by an internal combustion engine but older machines may use an electric motor to drive an alternator or generator. In this configuration the utility power is converted first into mechanical energy then back into electrical energy to achieve the step-down effect similar to a transformer. Because the output of the generator can be direct current, or even a higher frequency AC, these older machines can produce DC from AC without any need for rectifiers of any type, or can also be used for implementing formerly-used variations on so-called heliarc (most often now called TIG) welders, where the need for a higher frequency add-on module box is avoided by the alternator simply producing higher frequency ac current directly.

=== Inverter ===
Since the advent of high-power semiconductors such as the insulated gate bipolar transistor (IGBT), it is now possible to build a switched-mode power supply capable of coping with the high loads of arc welding. These designs are known as inverter welding units. They generally first rectify the utility AC power to DC; then they switch (invert) the DC power into a stepdown transformer to produce the desired welding voltage or current. The switching frequency is typically 10 kHz or higher. Although the high switching frequency requires sophisticated components and circuits, it drastically reduces the bulk of the step down transformer, as the mass of magnetic components (transformers and inductors) that is required for achieving a given power level goes down rapidly as the operating (switching) frequency is increased. The inverter circuitry can also provide features such as power control and overload protection. The high frequency inverter-based welding machines are typically more efficient and provide better control of variable functional parameters than non-inverter welding machines.

The IGBTs in an inverter based machine are controlled by a microcontroller, so the electrical characteristics of the welding power can be changed by software in real time, even on a cycle by cycle basis, rather than making changes slowly over hundreds if not thousands of cycles. Typically, the controller software will implement features such as pulsing the welding current, providing variable ratios and current densities through a welding cycle, enabling swept or stepped variable frequencies, and providing timing as needed for implementing automatic spot-welding; all of these features would be prohibitively expensive to design into a transformer-based machine, but require only program memory space in a software-controlled inverter machine. Similarly, it is possible to add new features to a software-controlled inverter machine if needed, through a software update, rather than through having to buy a more modern welder.

=== Other types ===
Additional types of welders also exist, besides the types using transformers, motor/generator, and inverters. For example, laser welders also exist, and they require an entirely different type of welding power supply design that does not fall into any of the types of welding power supplies discussed previously. Likewise, spot welders require a different type of welding power supply, typically containing elaborate timing circuits and large capacitor banks that are not commonly found with any other types of welding power supplies.
