= Non-ferrous metal =

Metals or alloys which do not contain significant amounts of iron

In metallurgy, non-ferrous metals are metals or alloys that do not contain iron (allotropes of iron, ferrite, and so on) in appreciable amounts.

Generally more costly than ferrous metals, non-ferrous metals are used because of desirable properties such as low weight (e.g. aluminium), higher conductivity (e.g. copper), non-magnetic properties or resistance to corrosion (e.g. zinc). Some non-ferrous materials are also used in the iron and steel industries. For example, bauxite is used as flux for blast furnaces, while others such as wolframite, pyrolusite, and chromite are used in making ferrous alloys.

Important non-ferrous metals include magnesium, aluminium, copper, lead, tin, titanium, and zinc, and alloys such as brass. Precious metals such as gold, silver, and platinum and exotic or rare metals such as mercury, tungsten, beryllium, bismuth, cerium, cadmium, niobium, indium, gallium, germanium, lithium, selenium, tantalum, tellurium, vanadium, and zirconium are also non-ferrous. They are usually obtained through minerals such as sulfides, carbonates, and silicates. Non-ferrous metals are usually refined through electrolysis.

== Recycling and pollution control ==
Due to their extensive use, non-ferrous scrap metals are usually recycled. The secondary materials in scrap are vital to the metallurgy industry, as the production of new metals often needs them. Some recycling facilities re-smelt and recast non-ferrous materials; the dross is collected and stored onsite while the metal fumes are filtered and collected. Non-ferrous scrap metals are sourced from industrial scrap materials, particle emissions and obsolete technology (for example, copper cables) scrap.

== Ancient history ==
Non-ferrous metals were the first metals used by humans for metallurgy. Gold, silver and copper existed in their native crystalline yet metallic form. These metals, though rare, could be found in quantities sufficient to attract the attention of humans. Less susceptible to oxygen than most other metals, they can be found even in weathered outcroppings. Copper was the first metal to be forged; it was soft enough to be fashioned into various objects by cold forging and could be melted in a crucible. Gold, silver and copper replaced some of the functions of other resources, such as wood and stone, owing to their ability to be shaped into various forms for different uses. Due to their rarity, these gold, silver and copper artifacts were treated as luxury items and handled with great care. The use of copper also heralded the transition from the Stone Age to the Copper Age. The Bronze Age, which succeeded the Copper Age, was again heralded by the invention of bronze, an alloy of copper with the non-ferrous metal tin.

== Mechanical and structural use ==
Non-ferrous metals are used in residential, commercial and industrial applications. Material selection for a mechanical or structural application requires some important considerations, including how easily the material can be shaped into a finished part and how its properties can be either intentionally or inadvertently altered in the process. Depending on the end use, metals can be simply cast into the finished part, or cast into an intermediate form, such as an ingot, then worked, or wrought, by rolling, forging, extruding, or other deformation process. Although the same operations are used with ferrous as well as nonferrous metals and alloys, the reaction of nonferrous metals to these forming processes is often more severe. Consequently, properties may differ considerably between the cast and wrought forms of the same metal or alloy.
