= ASTM G65 =

Testing standard for abrasion resistance of metals

ASTM G65 is an international ASTM test method standard for measuring abrasion resistance of metallic materials and their surface treatments using a dry sand/rubber wheel apparatus. First published in 1980 and most recently revised in 2021, it has become a predominant test method for evaluating wear resistance in industries including mining, petroleum, construction, and agriculture.

== History ==
The test method was developed to provide a reproducible laboratory procedure for ranking the abrasion resistance of materials subjected to low- to moderate-stress three-body abrasion, such as that produced by silica sand entrained between sliding surfaces.

It evolved from early work on sand-rubber-wheel testing by C. W. Haworth (1949) and was refined through round-robin evaluations organized by ASTM Committee G02 on Wear and Erosion during the 1970s, culminating in the first issue of ASTM G65, “Standard Test Method for Measuring Abrasion Using the Dry Sand/Rubber Wheel Apparatus.” Since then many revisions have occurred but the bulk of the testing process remains the same.

== Test principle ==
=== Apparatus ===
The test employs a rubber wheel of specified hardness (Durometer A-60) and diameter (228.6 mm) that rotates against a flat test specimen while a controlled flow of dry sand is fed between them. The sand abrasive needed is very specific rounded quartz grains (AFS 50/70 test sand) with a size distribution between 212 and 300 micrometers.

=== Test procedures ===
ASTM G65 defines five standard procedures (A through E) with varying parameters:

Procedure	Force (N)	Revolutions	Duration	Typical use
A	130	6,000	30 min	Ranking materials
B	130	2,000	10 min	Thin coatings (<0.5 mm)
C	130	100	Variable	Research studies
D	45	6,000	30 min	Thin/soft coatings
E	130	1,000	5 min	Material ranking

== Measurement and reporting ==
The primary measurement is volume loss in cubic millimeters (mm³), calculated from mass loss and material density. Results may also be reported as:

- Mass loss (mg)
- Wear rate (mm³/m of sliding distance)
- Relative wear resistance compared to a reference material

== Factors affecting results ==
Multiple variables can influence test outcomes:

=== Material factors ===
- Hardness and microstructure
- Presence and distribution of hard phases (carbides, borides)
- Work hardening characteristics
- Fracture toughness

=== Test variables ===
- Sand flow rate (300-400 g/min specified)
- Wheel condition and replacement interval
- Environmental humidity and temperature
- Specimen preparation and mounting

== Applications ==
The test is widely employed for:

- Materials selection for equipment exposed to abrasive conditions
- Quality control of hardfacing and surface treatments
- Development of wear-resistant alloys and coatings
- Forensic analysis of wear failures

Industries utilizing G65 testing include:

- Mining and mineral processing (crusher components, slurry pumps)
- Agriculture (tillage tools, harvesting equipment)
- Oil and gas (drill pipe, valve components)
- Construction (excavator teeth, concrete handling)

== Limitations ==
ASTM G65 has several recognized limitations:

- Does not simulate all wear mechanisms (excludes impact wear, erosion corrosion)
- Limited to relatively low contact stresses
- May not correlate with field performance in wet or corrosive environments
- Ranking may differ from high-stress abrasion conditions like (ASTM G81)

== Related standards ==
- ASTM G75 - Test Method for Determination of Slurry Abrasivity (Miller Number)
- ASTM G76 - Test Method for Conducting Erosion Tests by Solid Particle Impingement
- ASTM G105 - Test Method for Conducting Wet Sand/Rubber Wheel Abrasion Tests
- ASTM B611 - Test Method for Determining the High Stress Abrasion Resistance
- DIN 50332 - German equivalent standard
- ISO 28080 - International standard for rubber wheel abrasion

== See also ==
- Abrasion (mechanical)
- Tribology
- Wear
- Hardness testing
- Surface engineering
