= Flame cleaning =

Flame cleaning, also known as flame gouging, is the process of cleaning a structural steel surface by passing an intensely hot oxyacetylene flame over it. Mill scale and rust are removed by the reducing effect of the flame and the action of the heat, leaving the surface in a condition suitable for wire brushing and painting.

== Overview ==

There are many uses for flame cleaning rather than just to remove rust and mill scale. It is also used as a removal tool for paints, bad welds, burrs, mechanical wear (scraping, cuts, gouges and more) along with other surface imperfections. The process of flame cleaning is not anything new and does not require any extra equipment than what would be found in a typical metal shop. It is just an oxygen-fuel torch that is used parallel with the surface to melt and blow off any blemishes that the operator wants to eliminate. Shown in the adjacent diagram, the surface is blasted with the oxygen-fuel torch across the surface versus the orthodox use of the flame as a cutting or gouging tool. Though the equipment is the same, the flame used in cleaning is drastically reduced to prevent excess removal of the surface. Various kinds of fuel can be run with the oxygen, for example acetylene.

Various surfaces can be cleaned using this process. The oxy-flame can work on assorted surface qualities and remove some of the hardest to clean substances such as lubricants and grease. Ceramics, steel constructions, offshore systems and even concrete elements can all be cleaned. Although the function of cleaning can be thoroughly accomplished, the general aesthetic look is damaged due to the burn marks by the oxy-flame. The surface is then ready for further processing such as painting, grinding or any other further operation.

== See also ==
- Air carbon arc cutting
