= Central Power Research Institute =

Power research facility in India

Central Power Research Institute (CPRI) is a research institute originally established by the Government of India in 1960, with headquarters in Bangalore. The Institute was re-organized into an Autonomous Society in the year 1978 under the aegis of the Ministry of Power, Government of India. The main objective of setting up the Institute is to serve as a national Level laboratory for undertaking applied research in electrical power engineering besides functioning as an independent national testing and certification authority for electrical equipment and components to ensure reliability in power systems and to innovate and develop new products.

== Research and development ==
CPRI has been taking programs in various areas of electrical power generation, transmission and distribution in the endeavor to assist utilities to supply reliable, uninterrupted and quality services to the consumers. The broad objectives with the research projects are taken up in CPRI are

1. Offering technical advice and trouble shooting.
2. Product development and improvement to meet global standards.
3. Bridging the gap in testing and developing special testing technologies.
4. Large collaborative research projects with utilities and industries.
5. Electrical products and process improvement.

While some of the programme are undertaken in collaboration with industries and utilities, other are taken up in-house to develop the expertise and infrastructure the power sector. The project proposals are planned well in advance keeping in mind the needs of the industry /utilities and are cleared by the committee on Research.

In CPRI, research and development projects of different dimensions are taken up under 4 schemes namely

1. IHRD (or In House Research and Development)
2. RSoP (Research Scheme on Power)
3. Sponsored projects
4. NPP (R&D under National Perspective Plan)

== Testing and certification ==
The performance of the institute in the field of testing and certification during the year 2009-2010 is very good as compared to 2008-2009. A total of 66347 tests on 22256 samples were conducted for 6127 organizations. The revenue realized from testing, certification and consultancy services rendered during this year increased to Rs.9600 lakhs as against Rs.7741 lakhs during 2008-2009.

New Testing Facilities

- IEC61850 protocol conformance testing laboratory
- Mobile field testing laboratory for On-site Accuracy Test and Condition Assessment of EHV Class
- Instrument Transformers
- Setting up 10kA Temperature Rise Test Facility.
- Test Facilities for Air-conditioners and Refrigerator.
- Automation of Tower Testing Station.
- Augmentation of Relay Testing laboratory
- Compression Test on Quadruple Spacer
- Testing 800 kV HDVC Tower for M/s. POWERGRID, Gurgaon
- Seismic pushover Test on Prototype RCC Framed structure
- Dynamic Testing of Distance Protection relay P443 for M/S. Areva T & D Ltd., PSP, Chennai.
- Testing of Distance Relays using Real Time Digital simulation for M/s.BGR Energy System Ltd.,
- Testing of numerical distance relays—SEL &OMEGA
- Destruction test on power electronics capacitors of ratings, 560 F, 3.8 kV DC, was conducted as per IEC 61881-1999 was conducted in the power capacitors laboratory for the first time, which has helped the customer in verifying the design aspects with reference to safety/protection
- For the first time in the country in a 1180 kvar 12 kv shunt capacitor was tested at the power Capacitor Laboratory. This is the highest unit rating (Kvar) tested.

Other important tests

- Under standards and labeling programme of Government of India, CPRI carried out the check testing of BEE star labeled products like refrigerators & TFLss against the work order from M/s BEE, New Delhi.
- M/s BEE has issued work order to CPRI for carrying out second-round check testing of refrigerators, TFLs and fans during the year 2010–2011
- Testing of solar lanterns is now undertaken at ECDD.
- Testing of LED lamps as per manufactures specifications is undertaken at ECDD
- ECDD has taken up field and lab evaluation of street light controllers as per manufactures specifications
- Under standards & labeling programme of Government of India, CPRI carried out the check testing of BEE star labeled products like Refrigerators & TFLs.

== Consultancy services ==
Consultancy is one of the major activities of the institute. The following are some of the important consultancy services rendered by the institute in various areas during the year under report

Distribution System

- BESCOM-DAS Project
- KPTCL–SCADA Project
- Restructured Accelerated Power development Reforms Programme (R-APDRP)
- Rajiv Gandhi Grameen Vidyutikaran Yojana (RGGVY) Project
- Power system studies

1. Study of electrical system for changed systems configuration for increased reliability for M/s Burrup Fertilizers Pty Ltd., Australia.
2. Power System study and Energy Audit of Reliance Industries Ltd., Hazira.
3. Consultancy service for augmenting power distribution network at SAIL-ISP, Burnpur township related area for ISP-SAIL, Burnpur.
4. Technical services for power line design with low loss conductor for sterlite private limited.
5. Transient simulation studies of 14 MVA and 25 MVA furnace transformer for RSP, Rourkela.
6. Testing of load management system controller for Jindal steel plant.
7. Testing of composite intelligent load shedding controllers on RTDS for M/s ABB.

- Grounding Studies

1. Evaluation of earthing system with INDELEC Compound as filler material.
2. Long term measurement of ground resistance of Terec+ compound based Ear thing system
3. Condition monitoring and diagnostics of substations and power plants.
4. Long term measurement of ground resistance of Curec+ and Curecon compound based Ear thing system

- Performance and energy efficiency
- Consultancy for thermal/hydro power stations

1. RLA assignments involving in-situ oxide scale measurements and microstructure replication studies.
2. Fibroscopic inspection of LTRH/Economizer coils.
3. Crystal size and lattice strain measurements in nano coatings.
4. Corrosion mapping of water wall tubes using Low Frequency Electro Magnetic Technique (LFET).
5. Residual Life Assessment of penstocks & Hydro turbine components.
6. Hydrogen embrittlement in water wall tubes.
7. The performance evaluation study of Electrostatic precipitator.
8. Characterization and beneficiation of fly ash cenospheres generated at Simhadri thermal power project.
9. Pipe & Hangers Inspection and flexibility analysis for high energy pipeline systems for thermal power plants.

- Transmission towers and accessories.
- Vibration & seismic performance.

== Quality accreditations ==
The facilities of the Institute are accredited as per ISO/IEC 17025 quality norms and the Institute has acquired international accreditations like Short Circuit Testing Liaison for its global acceptance. Certification of the Institute is gaining acceptance in the countries of Middle East, Africa and South East Asia.

== CPRI network ==
CPRI has its head office in Bangalore and the Institute has six facilities at Bhopal, Hyderabad, Nagpur, Noida, Kolkata and Guwahati.

== See also ==
- Electric Power Research Institute
