= Plasma arc welding =

Welding process

1. Plasma gas, 2. Nozzle protection, 3. Shield Gas, 4. Electrode, 5. Nozzle constriction, 6. Electric arc

Plasma arc welding (PAW) is an arc welding process similar to gas tungsten arc welding (GTAW). The electric arc is formed between an electrode (which is usually but not always made of sintered tungsten) and the workpiece. The key difference from GTAW is that in PAW, the electrode is positioned within the body of the torch, so the plasma arc is separated from the shielding gas envelope. The plasma is then forced through a fine-bore copper nozzle which constricts the arc and the plasma exits the orifice at high velocities (approaching the speed of sound) and a temperature approaching 28,000 °C (50,000 °F) or higher.

Arc plasma is a temporary state of a gas. The gas gets ionized by electric current passing through it and it becomes a conductor of electricity. In ionized state, atoms are broken into electrons (−) and cations (+) and the system contains a mixture of ions, electrons and highly excited atoms. The degree of ionization may be between 1% and greater than 100% (possible with double and triple degrees of ionization). Such states exist as more electrons are pulled from their orbits.

The energy of the plasma jet and thus the temperature depends upon the electrical power employed to create arc plasma. A typical value of temperature obtained in a plasma jet torch is on the order of 28,000 °C (50,400 °F), compared to about 5,500 °C (9,930 °F) in ordinary electric welding arc. All welding arcs are (partially ionized) plasmas, but the one in plasma arc welding is a constricted arc plasma.

Just as oxy-fuel torches can be used for either welding or cutting, so too can plasma torches.

== Concept ==
Plasma arc welding is an arc welding process wherein coalescence is produced by the heat obtained from a constricted arc setup between a tungsten/alloy tungsten electrode and the water-cooled (constricting) nozzle (non-transferred arc) or between a tungsten/alloy tungsten electrode and the job (transferred arc). The process employs two inert gases, one forms the arc plasma and the second shields the arc plasma. Filler metal may or may not be added.

== History ==
The plasma arc welding and cutting process was invented by Robert M. Gage in 1953 and patented in 1957. The process was unique in that it could achieve precision cutting and welding on both thin and thick metals. It was also capable of spray coating hardening metals onto other metals. One example was the spray coating of the turbine blades of the Saturn V rocket.

== Principle of operation ==
Plasma arc welding is an advanced form of tungsten inert gas (TIG) welding. In the case of TIG, it is an open arc shielded by argon or helium, whereas plasma uses a special torch where the nozzle is used to constrict the arc while the shielding gas is separately supplied by the torch. The arc is constricted with the help of a water-cooled small diameter nozzle which squeezes the arc, increases its pressure, temperature and heat intensely and thus improves arc stability, arc shape and heat transfer characteristics.

Plasma arcs are formed using gas in two forms; laminar (low pressure and low flow) and turbulent (high pressure and high flow).

The gases used are argon, helium, hydrogen or a mixture of these. In the case of plasma welding, laminar flow (low pressure and low flow of plasma gas) is employed to ensure that the molten metal is not blown out of the weld zone.

The non-transferred arc (pilot arc) is employed during plasma-welding to initiate the welding process. The arc is formed between the electrode(-) and the water-cooled constricting nozzle (+). A non-transferred arc is initiated by using a high-frequency unit in the circuit. After the initial high-frequency start, the pilot arc (low current) is formed between the electrodes by employing a low current. After the main arc is struck, the nozzle is neutral or in case of welding-mesh using micro plasma, there can be an option given to have a continuous pilot arc. A transferred arc possesses high energy density and plasma jet velocity. Depending on the current used and flow of gas, it can be employed to cut and melt metals.

Microplasma uses current between 0.1 and 10 amps and is used for foils, bellow, and thin sheets. This is an autogenous process and normally does not use filler wire or powder.

Medium plasma uses current between 10 and 100 amps and is used for higher-thickness plate welding with filler wire or autogenous up to 6 mm (0.24 in) plates and metal deposition (hardfacing) using specialised torches and powder feeders (PTA) using metal powders.

High-current plasma above 100 amps is used with filler wires welding at high travel speeds.

Other applications of plasma are plasma-cutting, heating, deposition of diamond films (Kurihara et al. 1989), material processing, metallurgy (production of metals and ceramics), plasma-spraying, and underwater cutting.

== Equipment ==
The equipment needed in plasma arc welding along with their functions are as follows:

- Current and gas decay control: Required to close the key hole properly while terminating the weld in the structure.
- Fixture: Required to avoid atmospheric contamination of the molten metal under bead.
- Materials: Steel, aluminium, and other materials
- High-frequency generator and current limiting resistors: Used for arc ignition. The arc-starting system may be separate or built into the system.
- Plasma torch: Used for either transferred arc or non-transferred arc type. It is hand operated or mechanized. At present, almost all applications require automated system. The torch is water-cooled to increase the life of the nozzle and the electrode. The size and the type of nozzle tip are selected depending upon the metal to be welded, weld shapes and desired penetration depth.
- Power supply: A direct-current power source (generator or rectifier) having drooping characteristics and open circuit voltage of 70 volts or above is suitable for plasma arc welding. Rectifiers are generally preferred over DC generators. Working with helium as an inert gas needs open circuit voltage above 70 volts. This higher voltage can be obtained by series operation of two power sources; or the arc can be initiated with argon at normal open-circuit voltage and then helium can be switched on.

Typical welding parameters for plasma arc welding are as follows:

Current 50 to 350 amps, voltage 27 to 31 volts, gas flow rates 2 to 40 liters/minute (lower range for orifice gas and higher range for outer shielding gas), direct current electrode negative (DCEN) is normally employed for plasma arc welding except for the welding of aluminum in which cases water-cooled electrode is preferable for reverse-polarity welding, i.e. direct-current electrode positive (DCEP).

- Shielding gases: Two inert gases or gas mixtures are employed. The orifice gas at lower pressure and flow rate forms the plasma arc. The pressure of the orifice gas is intentionally kept low to avoid weld metal turbulence, but this low pressure is not able to provide proper shielding of the weld pool. To have suitable shielding protection same or another inert gas is sent through the outer shielding ring of the torch at comparatively higher flow rates. Most of the materials can be welded with argon, helium, argon+hydrogen and argon+helium, as inert gases or gas mixtures. Argon is commonly used. Helium is preferred where a broad heat input pattern and flatter cover pass is desired without key-hole mode weld. A mixture of argon and hydrogen supplies heat energy higher than when only argon is used and thus permits keyhole mode welds in nickel-base alloys, copper-base alloys and stainless steels.

For cutting purposes, a mixture of argon and hydrogen (10-30%) or that of nitrogen may be used. Hydrogen, because of its dissociation into atomic form and thereafter recombination generates temperatures above those attained by using argon or helium alone. In addition, hydrogen provides a reducing atmosphere, which helps in preventing oxidation of the weld and its vicinity. Care must be taken, as hydrogen diffusing into the metal can lead to embrittlement in some metals and steels.

- Voltage control: Required in contour welding. In normal key-hole welding, a variation in arc length up to 1.5 mm does not affect weld bead penetration or bead shape to any significant extent and thus a voltage control is not considered essential.

== Process description ==
The technique of work-piece cleaning and filler-metal addition is similar to that in TIG welding. Filler metal is added at the leading edge of the weld pool. Filler metal is not required in making root-pass weld.

Type of Joints: For welding work piece up to 25 mm thick, joints like square butt, J or V are employed. Plasma welding is used to make both key hole and non-key hole types of welds.

Making a non-key-hole weld: The process can make non-key-hole welds on work pieces having thickness 2.4 mm and under.

Making a keyhole welds: An outstanding characteristic of plasma arc welding, owing to exceptional penetrating power of plasma jet, is its ability to produce keyhole welds in work piece having thickness from 2.5 mm to 25 mm. A keyhole effect is achieved through right selection of current, nozzle-orifice diameter and travel speed, which create a forceful plasma jet to penetrate completely through the work piece. Plasma jet in no case should expel the molten metal from the joint. The major advantages of the keyhole technique are the ability to penetrate rapidly through relatively thick root sections and to produces a uniform under bead without mechanical backing. Also, the ratio of the depth of penetration to the width of the weld is much higher, resulting narrower weld and heat-affected zone. As the weld progresses, base metal ahead the keyhole melts, flow around the same solidifies and forms the weld bead. Key-holing aids deep penetration at faster speeds and produces high-quality bead. While welding thicker pieces, in laying others than root run, and using filler metal, the force of plasma jet is reduced by suitably controlling the amount of orifice gas.

Plasma arc welding is an advancement over the GTAW process. This process uses a non-consumable tungsten electrode and an arc constricted through a fine-bore copper nozzle. PAW can be used to join all metals that are weldable with GTAW (i.e., most commercial metals and alloys). Difficult-to-weld in metals by PAW include bronze, cast iron, lead and magnesium. Several basic PAW process variations are possible by varying the current, plasma gas-flow rate, and the orifice diameter, including:

- Micro-plasma (< 15 Amperes)
- Melt-in mode (15–100 Amperes)
- Keyhole mode (>100 Amperes)
- Plasma arc welding has a greater energy concentration as compared to GTAW.
- A deep, narrow penetration is achievable, with a maximum depth of 12 to 18 mm (0.47 to 0.71 in) depending on the material.
- Greater arc stability allows a much longer arc length (stand-off), and much greater tolerance to arc-length changes.
- PAW requires relatively expensive and complex equipment as compared to GTAW; proper torch maintenance is critical.
- Welding procedures tend to be more complex and less tolerant to variations in fit-up, etc.
- Operator skill required is slightly greater than for GTAW.
- Orifice replacement is necessary.

== Process variables ==
=== Gases ===
At least two separate (and possibly three) flows of gas are used in PAW:

- Plasma gas – flows through the orifice and becomes ionized.
- Shielding gas – flows through the outer nozzle and shields the molten weld from the atmosphere.
- Back-purge and trailing gas – required for certain materials and applications.

These gases can all be same, or of differing composition.

=== Key process variables ===
- Current Type and Polarity
- DCEN from a CC source is standard
- AC square-wave is common on aluminum and magnesium
- Welding current and pulsing - Current can vary from 0.5 A to 1200 A; the current can be constant or pulsed at frequencies up to 20 kHz
- Gas-flow rate (This critical variable must be carefully controlled based upon the current, orifice diameter and shape, gas mixture, and the base material and thickness.)

== Other plasma arc processes ==
Depending upon the design of the torch (e.g., orifice diameter), electrode design, gas type and velocities, and the current levels, several variations of the plasma process are achievable, including:

- Plasma arc cutting (PAC)
- Plasma arc gouging
- Plasma arc surfacing
- Plasma arc spraying

=== Plasma arc cutting ===
When used for cutting, the plasma gas flow is increased so that the deeply penetrating plasma jet cuts through the material and molten material is removed as cutting dross. PAC differs from oxy-fuel cutting in that the plasma process operates by using the arc to melt the metal whereas in the oxy-fuel process, the oxygen oxidizes the metal and the heat from the exothermic reaction melts the metal. Unlike oxy-fuel cutting, the PAC process can be applied to cutting metals which form refractory oxides such as stainless steel, cast iron, aluminum and other non-ferrous alloys. Since PAC was introduced by Praxair Inc. at the American Welding Society show in 1954, many process refinements, gas developments, and equipment improvements have occurred.
