= Electric Power Research Institute =

American independent nonprofit organization

- Electric Power Research Institute
- Abbreviation: EPRI
- Formation: 1972
- Founder: Chauncey Starr
- Founded at: Palo Alto, California
- Type: non-profit
- Headquarters: Palo Alto
- Locations: Africa, Americas, Asia, Europe, Middle East
- Origins: United States Congress
- Products: White papers, research reports, Annual Portfolio Brochure
- President & CEO: Arshad Mansoor
- Board of directors: Tom Kent, chairman
- Subsidiaries: EPRI International Inc.

The Electric Power Research Institute (EPRI) is an American independent, nonprofit organization that conducts research and development related to the generation, delivery, and use of electricity to help address challenges in the energy industry, including reliability, efficiency, affordability, health, safety, and the environment.

EPRI's principal offices and laboratories are located in Palo Alto, California; Charlotte, North Carolina; Knoxville, Tennessee; Washington, DC; and Lenox, Massachusetts.

== History ==
In November 1965, the Great Northeastern Blackout left 30 million people in the United States and parts of Eastern Canada without electricity. Historic in scale and impact, it demonstrated the nation's growing dependence upon electricity and its vulnerability to power loss. The event marked a watershed moment for the U.S. electricity sector and contributed the creation of the Electric Power Research Institute.

Following the blackout, among other factors, the United States Congress held hearings in the early 1970s to address the lack of research guiding the power industry. In 1972, at a formal hearing of the U.S. Senate Commerce Committee, Chauncey Starr presented a vision for the Electric Power Research Institute to serve Congress's mandate for objective, scientific research.

Starr, then the Dean of the UCLA School of Engineering and Applied Science, led the initiative to create an independent research and development organization to support the electricity sector. He served as the founding president of the EPRI for five years, formally retired at age 65, yet while continuing his work at EPRI for the next 30 years.

In 1994, EPRI received the American Meteorological Society's Award for Outstanding Service to Meteorology by a Corporation, for its development of the Model Evaluation Consortium Assessment (MECCA).

According to EPRI's 2018 research portfolio, its work encompasses research in technology, the workforce, operations, systems planning and other areas that guide and support the development of new regulatory frameworks, market opportunities, and value to energy consumers.

Since 2018, the EPRI has held an annual electrification conference and expo, and participates in the annual United Nations Climate Change Conference.

In July 2021, EPRI and the North American Electric Reliability Corporation (NERC), Atlanta, announced their collaboration to improve both the reliability and the resilience of the electrical grid in North America.

== Research ==
EPRI conducts research and development into energy generation, nuclear energy, and power delivery, with three specialized labs. It collaborates with over 450 companies in 45 countries, and is a leading source of scientific and engineering analytics.

The institute's generation research focuses on information, processes and technologies to improve the flexibility, reliability, performance, and efficiency of existing fossil-fueled and renewable energy-generating infrastructure.

On-going research into nuclear technologies, technical guidance, and knowledge transfer tools to support the operation of existing nuclear assets and inform the deployment of new nuclear technology.

EPRI's distributed energy resources and customer research area focuses on distributed energy resource integration, efficient electrification, connectivity and information technology enabling an integrated grid and cyber security guidance.

Transmission, distribution, and substation research focuses on improving transmission asset management analytics, technology for mobile field guides, robotics and sensors to automate asset inspections, and improve understanding of electromagnetic pulse.

== Projects and reports ==
In October 2024, the EPRI announced a three-year project with private industry, the Data Center Flexible Load Initiative (DCFlex), to demonstrate that data centers could improve interconnection and efficiency while stabilizing the electric grid, across 10 power "flexibility hubs". Among the participants were NVIDIA, Google and Meta, which joined EPRI's initiative to explore how data centers could support grid reliability through load flexibility and streamlined interconnection. By March 2025, the consortium had grown to 40 power producers, utility companies and data center operators, including new European participation.

== See also ==
- NOREM
- Central Power Research Institute
