= Plasma cutting =

Process

CNC plasma cutting

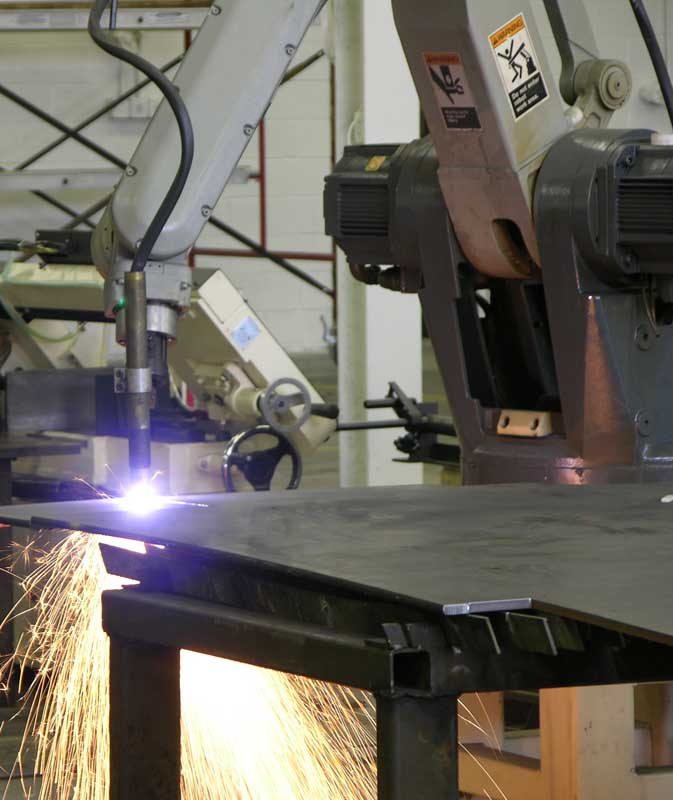
Plasma cutting performed by an industrial robot

Plasma cutting is a process that cuts through electrically conductive materials by means of an accelerated jet of hot plasma (electric arc). Typical materials cut with a plasma torch include steel, stainless steel, aluminum, brass and copper, although other conductive metals may be cut as well. Plasma cutting is often used in fabrication shops, automotive repair and restoration, industrial construction, and salvage and scrapping operations. Due to the high speed and precision cuts combined with low cost, plasma cutting sees widespread use from large-scale industrial computer numerical control (CNC) applications down to small hobbyist shops.

The basic plasma cutting process involves creating an electrical channel of superheated, electrically ionized gas i.e. plasma from the plasma cutter itself, through the workpiece to be cut, thus forming a completed electric circuit back to the plasma cutter through a grounding clamp. This is accomplished by a compressed gas (oxygen, air, inert and others depending on material being cut) which is blown through a focused nozzle at high speed toward the workpiece. An electrical arc is then formed within the gas, between an electrode near or integrated into the gas nozzle and the workpiece itself. The electrical arc ionizes some of the gas, thereby creating an electrically conductive channel of plasma. As electricity from the cutter torch travels down this plasma it delivers sufficient heat to melt through the workpiece. At the same time, much of the high-velocity plasma and compressed gas blow the hot molten metal away, thereby separating, i.e. cutting through, the workpiece.

Plasma cutting is an effective way of cutting thin and thick materials alike. Hand-held torches can usually cut up to 38 mm (1.5 in) thick steel plate, and stronger computer-controlled torches can cut steel up to 150 mm (6 in) thick. Since plasma cutters produce a very hot and very localized "cone" to cut with, they are extremely useful for cutting sheet metal in curved or angled shapes.

The arcs are generated in a three step process. A high voltage spark briefly ionizes the air within the torch head. This makes the air conductive and allows the "pilot arc" to form. The pilot arc forms within the torch head, with current flowing from the electrode to the nozzle inside the torch head. The pilot arc begins to burn up the nozzle, a consumable part, while in this phase. The air then blows the plasma out the nozzle towards the work, providing a current path from the electrode to the work. When the control system senses current flowing from the electrode to the work, it cuts the electrical connection to the nozzle. Current then flows from the electrode to the work, and the arc forms outside the nozzle. Cutting can then proceed without burning up the nozzle. Nozzle life is limited by the number of arc starts, not cutting time.

== History ==
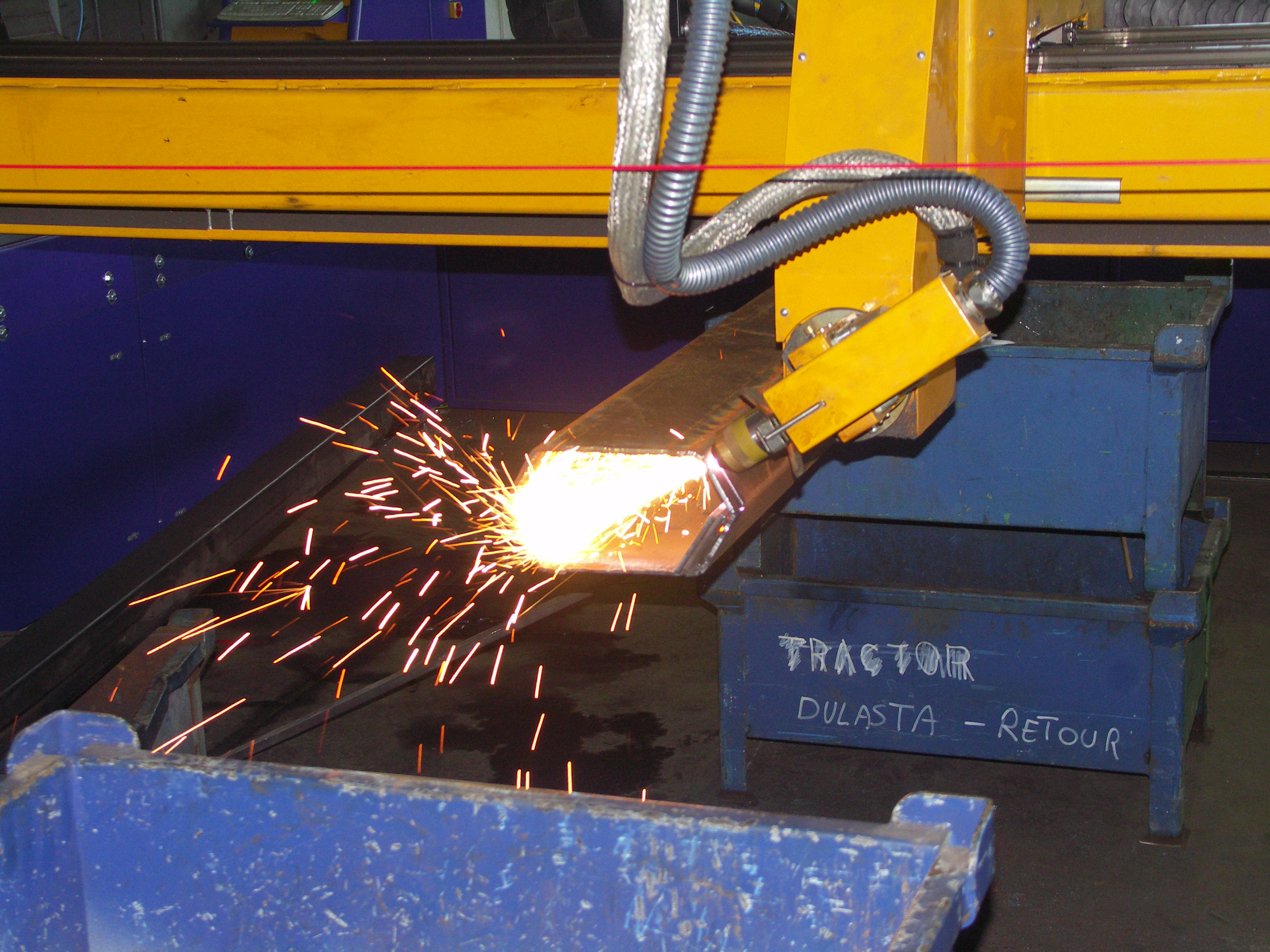
Plasma cutting with a tilting head

Plasma cutting grew out of plasma welding in the 1960s, and emerged as a very productive way to cut sheet metal and plate in the 1980s. It had the advantages over traditional "metal against metal" cutting of producing no metal chips, giving accurate cuts, and producing a cleaner edge than oxy-fuel cutting. Early plasma cutters were large, somewhat slow and expensive and, therefore, tended to be dedicated to repeating cutting patterns in a "mass production" mode.

As with other machine tools, CNC (computer numerical control) technology was applied to plasma cutting machines in the late 1980s into the 1990s, giving plasma cutting machines greater flexibility to cut diverse shapes "on demand" based on a set of instructions that were programmed into the machine's numerical control. These CNC plasma cutting machines were, however, generally limited to cutting patterns and parts in flat sheets of steel, using only two axes of motion (referred to as X Y cutting).

== Safety ==
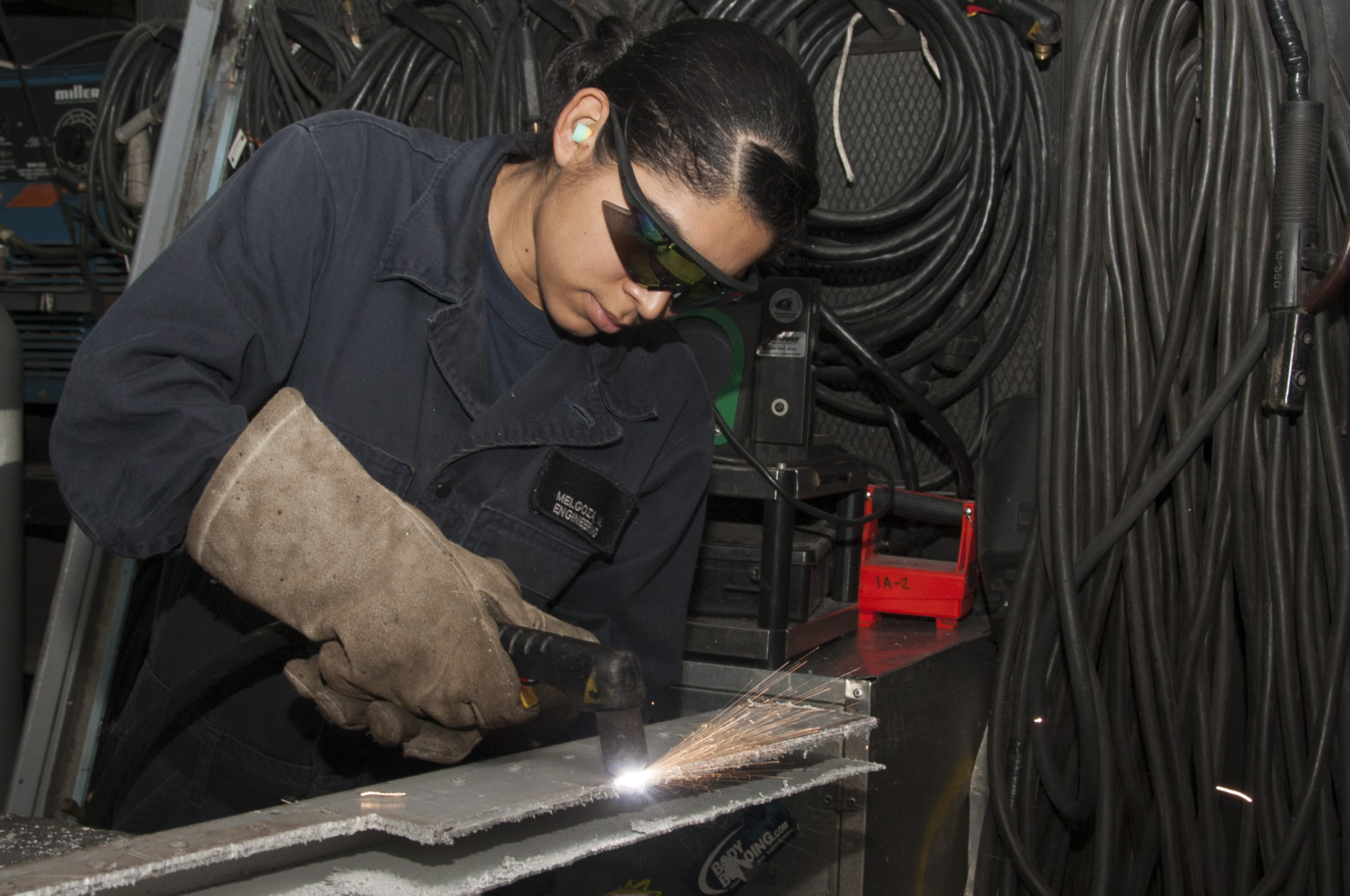
A technician wearing safety glasses while using a plasma cutter aboard the USS George Washington

Proper eye protection and face shields are needed to prevent eye damage called arc eye as well as damage from debris. It is recommended to use green lens shade #5. OSHA recommends a shade 8 for arc current less than 300 A, but notes that "These values apply where the actual arc is clearly seen. Experience has shown that lighter filters may be used when the arc is hidden by the workpiece." Lincoln Electric, a manufacturer of plasma cutting equipment, says, "Typically a darkness shade of #7 to #9 is acceptable." Longevity Global, Inc., another manufacturer, offers this more specific table for eye protection for plasma arc cutting at lower amperages:

Current	Minimum shade (ANSI Z87.1+)
0–20 A	#4
20–40 A	#5
40–60 A	#6
60–80 A	#8

Leather gloves, an apron and a jacket are also recommended to prevent burns from sparks and hot metal.

Working in a clean area free of flammable liquids, materials and gases is very important. Sparks and hot metal from a plasma cutter can quickly cause fires if they are not isolated from flammable objects. Plasma cutters can send hot sparks flying up to 1.5 meters (5 feet) away in certain situations. Machine operators are typically blind to any fire that has started because they are behind their face shields.

== Starting methods ==
Plasma cutters use a number of methods to start the arc. In some units, the arc is created by putting the torch in contact with the work piece. Some cutters use a high voltage, high frequency circuit to start the arc. This method has a number of disadvantages, including risk of electrocution, difficulty of repair, spark gap maintenance, and the large amount of radio frequency emissions. Plasma cutters working near sensitive electronics, such as CNC hardware or computers, start the pilot arc by other means. The nozzle and electrode are in contact. The nozzle is the cathode, and the electrode is the anode. When the plasma gas begins to flow, the nozzle is blown forward. A third, less common method is capacitive discharge into the primary circuit via a silicon controlled rectifier.

== Inverter plasma cutters ==
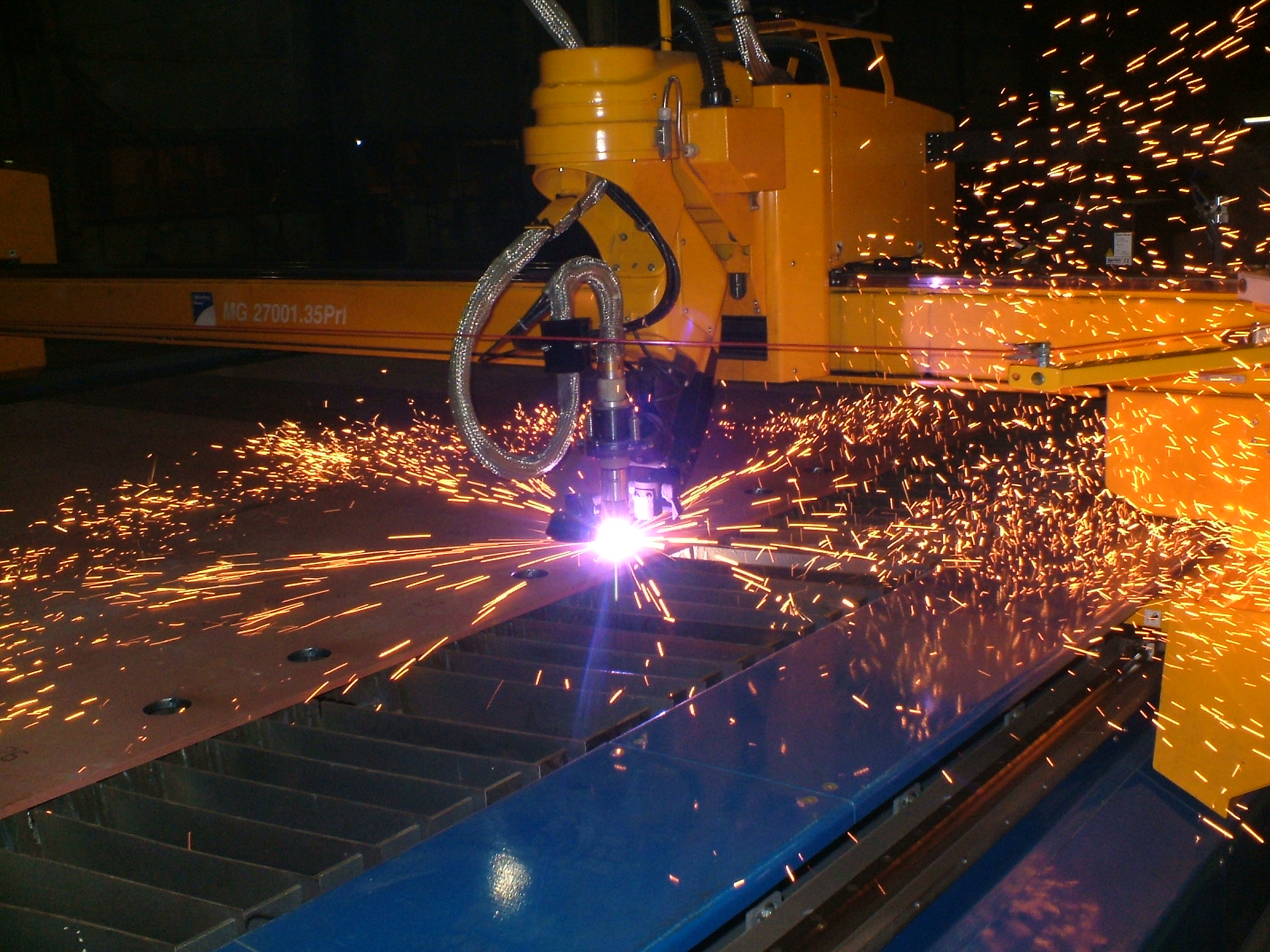
Plasma cutting

Analog plasma cutters, typically requiring more than 2 kilowatts, use a heavy mains-frequency transformer. Inverter plasma cutters rectify the mains supply to DC, which is fed into a high-frequency transistor inverter between 10 kHz to about 200 kHz. Higher switching frequencies allow smaller transformers resulting in overall size and weight reduction.

The transistors used were initially MOSFETs, but are now increasingly using IGBTs. With paralleled MOSFETs, if one of the transistors activates prematurely it can lead to a cascading failure of one quarter of the inverter. A later invention, IGBTs, are not as subject to this failure mode. IGBTs can generally be found in high-current machines where it is not possible to parallel enough MOSFET transistors.

The switch mode topology is referred to as a dual transistor off-line forward converter. Although lighter and more powerful, some inverter plasma cutters, especially those without power factor correction, cannot be run from a generator (that means manufacturer of the inverter unit forbids doing so; it is only valid for small, light portable generators). However newer models have internal circuitry that allows units without power factor correction to run on light power generators.

== CNC cutting methods ==
Some plasma cutter manufacturers build CNC cutting tables, and some have the cutter built into the table. CNC tables allow a computer to control the torch head producing clean sharp cuts. Modern CNC plasma equipment is capable of multi-axis cutting of thick material, allowing opportunities for complex welding seams that are not possible otherwise. For thinner material, plasma cutting is being progressively replaced by laser cutting, due mainly to the laser cutter's superior hole-cutting abilities.

A specialized use of CNC plasma cutters has been in the heating, ventilating and air conditioning (HVAC) industry. Software processes information on ductwork and creates flat patterns to be cut on the cutting table by the plasma torch. This technology has enormously increased productivity within the industry since its introduction in the early 1980s.

CNC plasma cutters are also used in many workshops to create decorative metalwork. For instance, commercial and residential signage, wall art, address signs, and outdoor garden art.

In recent years there has been even more development. Traditionally the machines' cutting tables were horizontal, but now vertical CNC plasma cutting machines are available, providing for a smaller footprint, increased flexibility, optimum safety and faster operation.

== CNC plasma cutting configurations ==
There are three main configurations of CNC plasma cutting, and they are largely differentiated by the forms of materials before processing, and the flexibility of the cutting head.

=== 2-dimensional / 2-axis plasma cutting ===
This is the most common and conventional form of CNC plasma cutting. Producing flat profiles, where the cut edges are at 90 degrees to the material surface. High powered CNC plasma cutting beds are configured in this way, able to cut profiles from metal plate up to 150 mm thick.

=== 3-dimensional / 3+ axis plasma cutting ===
Once again, a process for producing flat profiles from sheet or plate metal, however with the introduction of an additional axis of rotation, the cutting head of a CNC plasma cutting machine can tilt whilst being taken through a conventional 2-dimensional cutting path. The result of this is cut edges at an angle other than 90 degrees to the material surface, for example 30-45 degree angles. This angle is continuous throughout the thickness of the material. This is typically applied in situations where the profile being cut is to be used as part of a welded fabrication as the angled edge forms part of the weld preparation. When the weld preparation is applied during the CNC plasma cutting process, secondary operations such as grinding or machining can be avoided, reducing cost. The angular cutting capability of 3-dimensional plasma cutting can also be used to create countersunk holes and chamfer edges of profiled holes.

=== Tube and section plasma cutting ===
Used in the processing of tube, pipe or any form of long section. The plasma cutting head usually remains stationary whilst the workpiece is fed through, and rotated around its longitudinal axis. There are some configurations where, as with 3-dimensional plasma cutting, the cutting head can tilt and rotate. This allows angled cuts to be made through the thickness of the tube or section, commonly taken advantage of in the fabrication of process pipework where cut pipe can be provided with a weld preparation in place of a straight edge.

== Electrode wear ==
The electrode inside the torch (which serves as the cathode) wears out during the cutting process. This degradation is caused by the extreme conditions near its surface, as well as the emission of electrons that sustain the arc current, both of which damage its structural integrity.

To increase their lifespan, plasma cutting electrodes are typically composed of two metals: a copper shell and a hafnium insert. Hafnium is a refractory material that helps reduce, but does not prevent, erosion.

As a result, electrodes are considered consumable components of plasma cutting torches. After a certain amount of use, they become too damaged and are instantly destroyed. A destroyed electrode can no longer initiate or maintain a cutting arc and must therefore be replaced.

The lifespan of an electrode is not entirely predictable. One study suggests that this variability may be related to the dimensions of the hafnium insert.

== Cut quality ==
Plasma cutting produces kerfs, but these are not perfectly shaped. Ideally, a plasma cut would result in a perfectly linear and extremely narrow kerf.

In practice, however, plasma-cut kerfs are wider at the top surface of the metal sheet than at the bottom.

Additionally, the left and right edges of the cut (relative to the cutting direction) are often asymmetrical. The origin of these asymmetries remains unclear.

Several cutting parameters — including cutting speed, arc current intensity, standoff distance between torch and workpiece, and gas injection pressures — significantly influence the quality of the cut.

== New technology ==
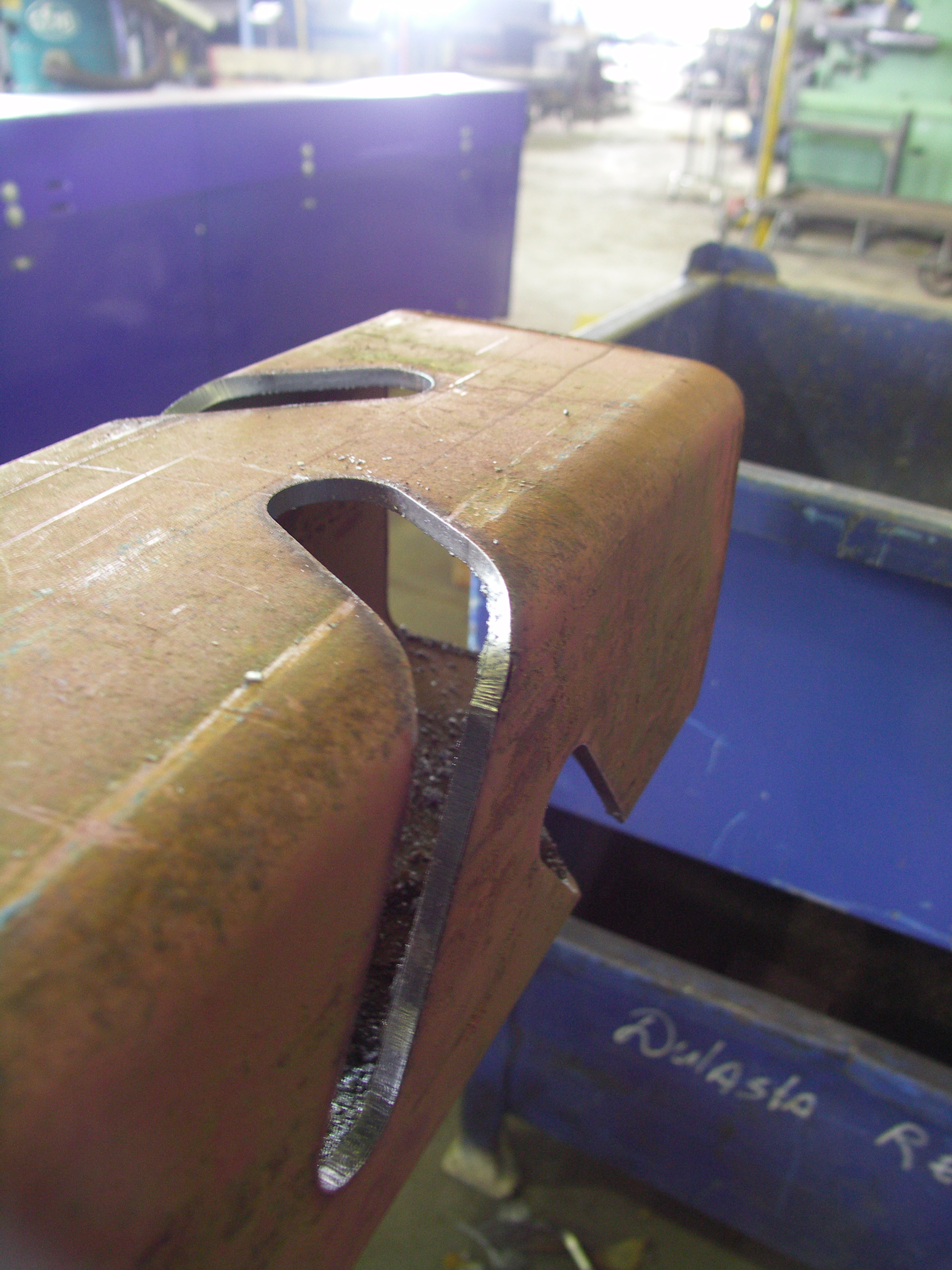
High performance cut

In the past decade plasma torch manufacturers have engineered new models with a smaller nozzle and a thinner plasma arc. This allows near-laser precision on plasma cut edges. Several manufacturers have combined precision CNC control with these torches to allow fabricators to produce parts that require little or no finishing.

== Costs ==
Plasma torches initially were expensive. For this reason they were usually only found in professional welding shops and well-stocked private garages and shops. However, modern plasma torches are becoming cheaper, and now are within the price range of many hobbyists, less than $300. Older units may be heavy, but still portable, while some newer ones with inverter technology weigh less, yet equal or exceed the capacities of older ones.

== See also ==
- Air carbon arc cutting
- Laser cutting
- Plasma arc welding
- Water jet cutter
- Welding
