= NOREM =

NOREM is a hardfacing material developed by the Electric Power Research Institute to deal with radiation safety issues associated with the use of cobalt alloys in nuclear power station coolant systems (see stellite for a discussion of the problem). It is a solid-solution strengthened austenitic matrix with a continuous network of eutectic and non-eutectic carbides at the grain boundaries. It is intended to be deposited by various welding processes.

== Characteristics ==
There are eight variants of NOREM currently available, depending on application and designated 02, 02A, 03A, 03B, 04A, 04B, 05A, 05B. A typical elemental composition is 60% iron, 25% chromium, 4.5% manganese, 4.0% nickel, 3.3% silicon, 2.0% molybdenum, 1.2% carbon. Earlier compositions included either significantly more manganese (12% in alloy 04) or significantly more nickel (8% in alloy M2).

These are extremely hard alloys. NOREM 02 is ten times as resistant as 308 stainless steel to cavitation erosion. They are essentially corrosion-immune under the conditions inside CANDU reactors and erode at about 200 micrograms per square centimetre per year under pressurized water reactor conditions. Due to the high hardness, the strength is relatively low: approximately 120 ksi (830 MPa) yield strength and it fails at 0.6% elongation.

== Use in power plants ==
The first use of NOREM was as replacement discs in three Chemical Volume Control System isolation valves at Consolidated Edison's Indian Point unit 2. It is now used in about 800 valves installed by about 30 utility companies. There has been one case of a NOREM valve disc being found damaged, at the Callaway Nuclear Generating Station, though it seems the valve was not being used in an appropriate application.

Given the high cavitation resistance, NOREM has been tested for hydroelectric applications; it seems not to be as impressively cavitation-resistant in the field as in the lab, though only one layer of the material was used in the test, and the Electric Power Research Institute recommends at least two.
