= Plasma torch =

Device for generating a directed flow of plasma

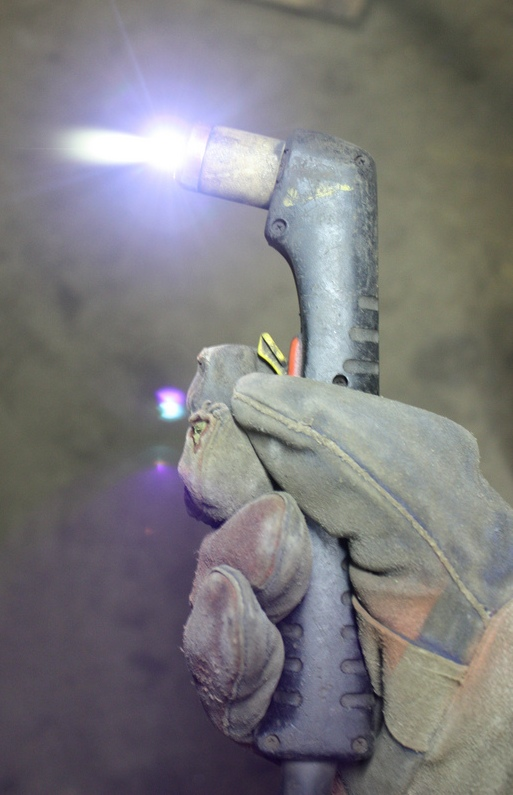
A plasma torch cutter

A plasma torch (also known as a plasma arc, plasma gun, plasma cutter, or plasmatron) is a device for generating a directed flow of plasma.

The plasma jet can be used for applications including plasma cutting, plasma arc welding, plasma spraying, and plasma gasification for waste disposal.

== Applications ==
Plasma torches are used in a range of industrial processes requiring high temperatures and concentrated energy. Common applications include cutting and welding of metals, as well as plasma spraying, in which heated material is deposited onto a surface to form a coating.

Thermal plasma torches are also used in metallurgical and waste-treatment processes. Applications include metal smelting and refining, recovery of metals from industrial wastes, and the treatment of hazardous and municipal wastes. In waste treatment, the high temperatures generated by plasma can destroy organic compounds and melt inorganic material, which can solidify into a vitrified slag.

== Types ==
Thermal plasmas are generated in plasma torches by direct current (DC), alternating current (AC), radio-frequency (RF) and other discharges. DC torches are the most commonly used and researched, because when compared to AC: "there is less flicker generation and noise, a more stable operation, better control, a minimum of two electrodes, lower electrode consumption, slightly lower refractory [heat] wear and lower power consumption".

=== Transferred vs. non-transferred ===
There are two types of DC torches: non-transferred and transferred. In non-transferred DC torches, the electrodes are inside the body/housing of the torch itself (creating the arc there). Whereas in a transferred torch one electrode is outside (and is usually the conductive material to be treated), allowing the arc to form outside of the torch over a larger distance.

A benefit of transferred DC torches is that the plasma arc is formed outside the water-cooled body, preventing heat loss—as is the case with non-transferred torches, where their electrical-to-thermal efficiency can be as low as 50%, but the hot water can itself be utilized. Furthermore, transferred DC torches can be used in a twin-torch setup, where one torch is cathodic and the other anodic, which has the earlier benefit of a regular transferred single-torch system, but allows their use with non-conductive materials, as there is no need for it to form the other electrode. However, these types of setups are rare as most common non-conductive materials do not require the precise cutting ability of a plasma torch. In addition, the discharge generated by this particular plasma source configuration is characterized by a complex shape and fluid dynamics that requires a 3D description in order to be predicted, making performance unsteady. The electrodes of non-transferred torches are larger, because they suffer more wear by the plasma arc.

The quality of plasma produced is a function of density (pressure), temperature and torch power (the greater the better). With regards to the efficiency of the torch itself—this can vary among manufacturers and torch technology; though for example, Leal-Quirós reports that for Westinghouse Plasma Corp. torches "a thermal efficiency of 90% is easily possible; the efficiency represents the percentage of arc power that exits the torch and enters the process".

=== Thermal plasma DC torches, non-transferred arc, hot cathode ===
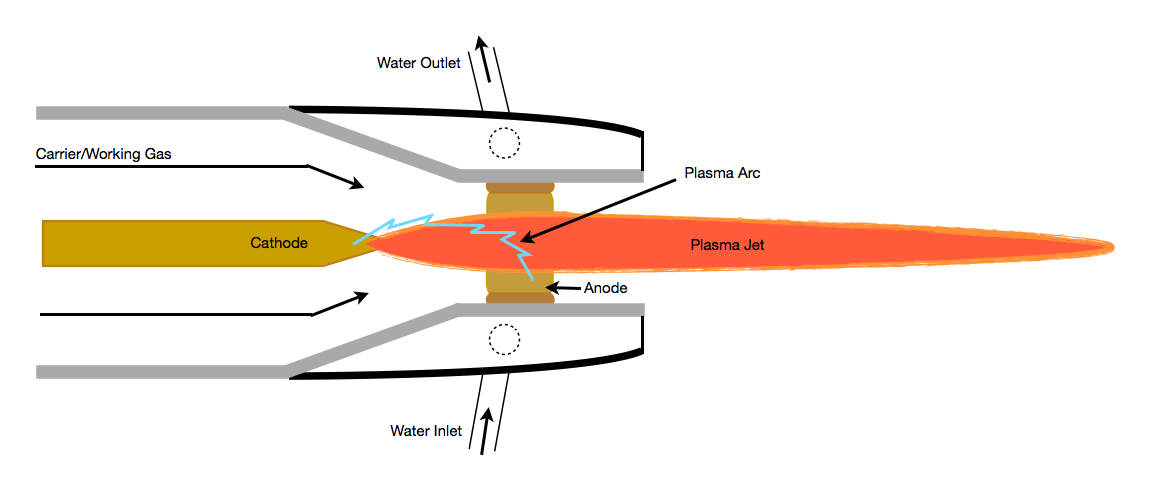
Cross-sectional representation of a non-transferred DC plasma torch. Showing the pointed cathode and annular anode. The inlets and outlets of the water-cooling system are labelled, note that the arc temperature can be up to 15,000 °C (27,000 °F). The plasma arc is drawn for illustration purposes only. Not to scale.

In a DC torch, the electric arc is formed between the electrodes (which can be made of copper, tungsten, graphite, silver etc.), and the thermal plasma is formed from the continual input of carrier/working gas, projecting outward as a plasma jet/flame (as can be seen in the adjacent image). In DC torches, the carrier gas can be, for example, either oxygen, nitrogen, argon, helium, air, or hydrogen; and although termed such, it does not have to be a gas (thus, better termed a carrier fluid).

For example, a research plasma torch at the Institute of Plasma Physics (IPP) in Prague, Czech Republic, functions with an H_{2}O vortex (as well as a small addition of argon to ignite the arc), and produces a high temperature/velocity plasma flame. In fact, early studies of arc stabilization employed a water-vortex. Overall, the electrode materials and carrier fluids have to be specifically matched to avoid excessive electrode corrosion or oxidation (and contamination of materials to be treated), while maintaining ample power and function.

Furthermore, the flow-rate of the carrier gas can be raised to promote a larger, more projecting plasma jet, provided that the arc current is sufficiently increased; and vice versa.

The plasma flame of a real plasma torch is a few inches long at most; it is to be distinguished from fictional long-range plasma weapons.

== Gallery ==
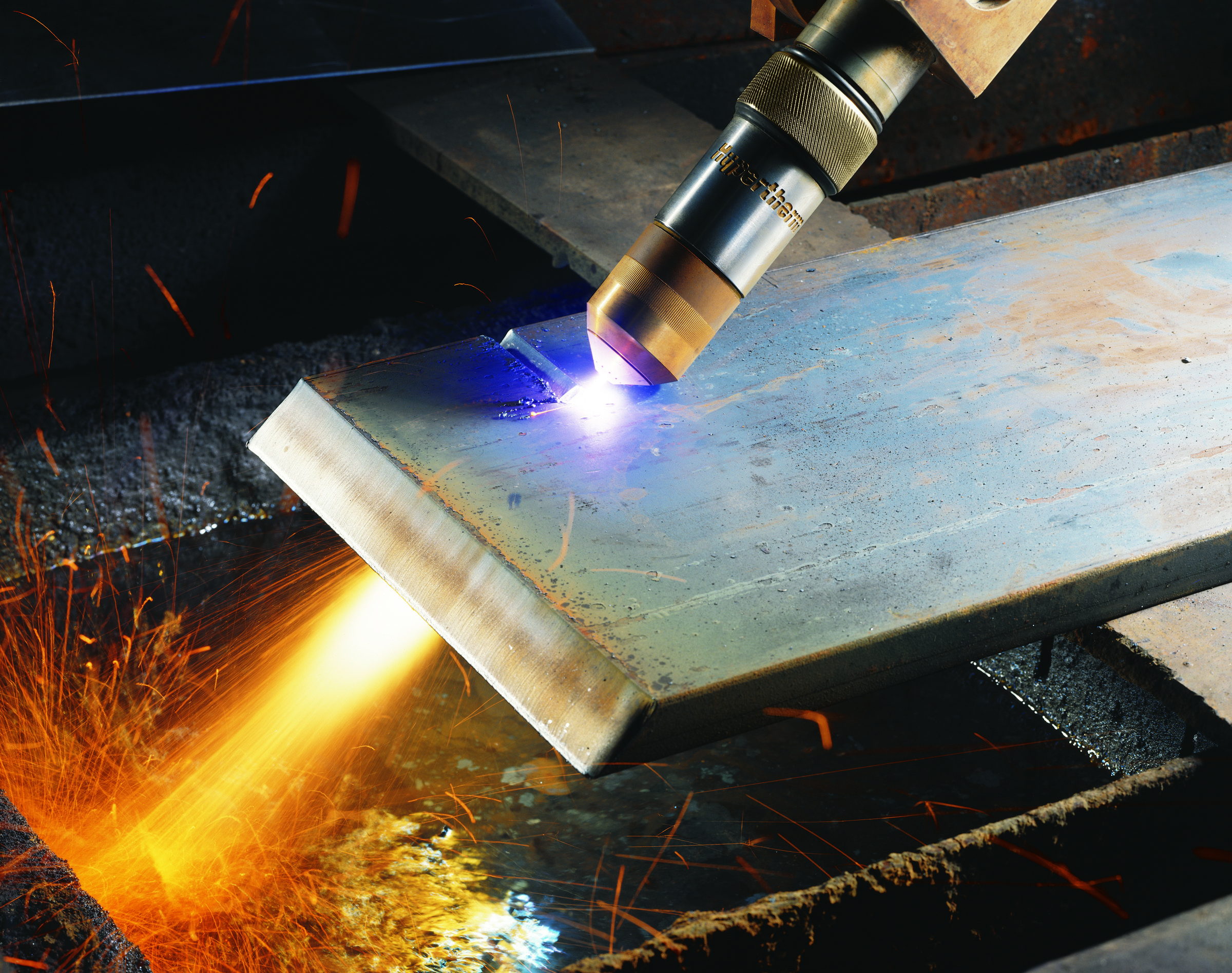
Close up of a Hypertherm HyPerformance plasma torch cutting metal

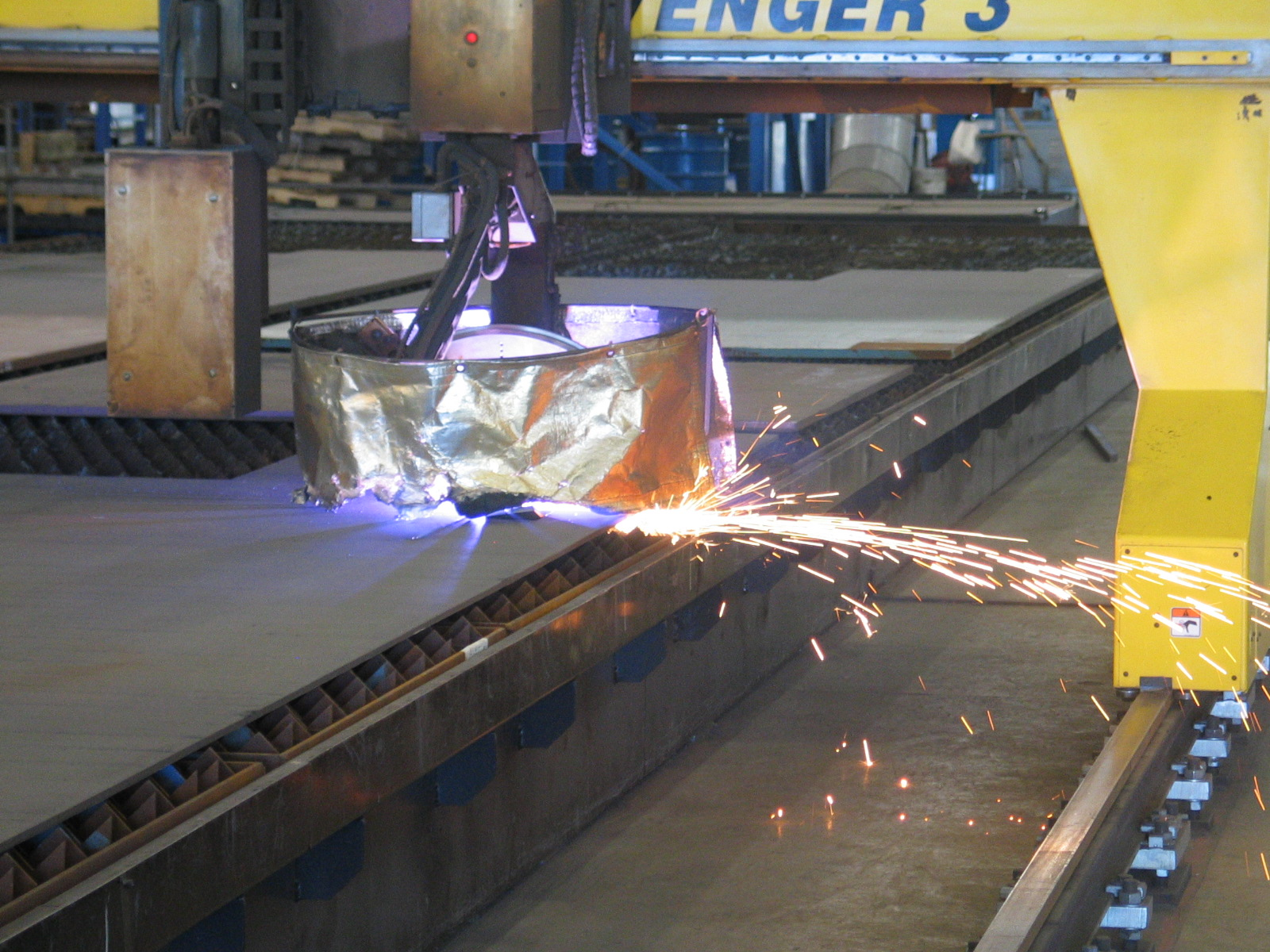
Prototype STEP-NC system driving plasma torch with ESAB CNC to cut and bevel half-inch steel plate. Laser marking of the front and back of the plate was also done in earlier operations.

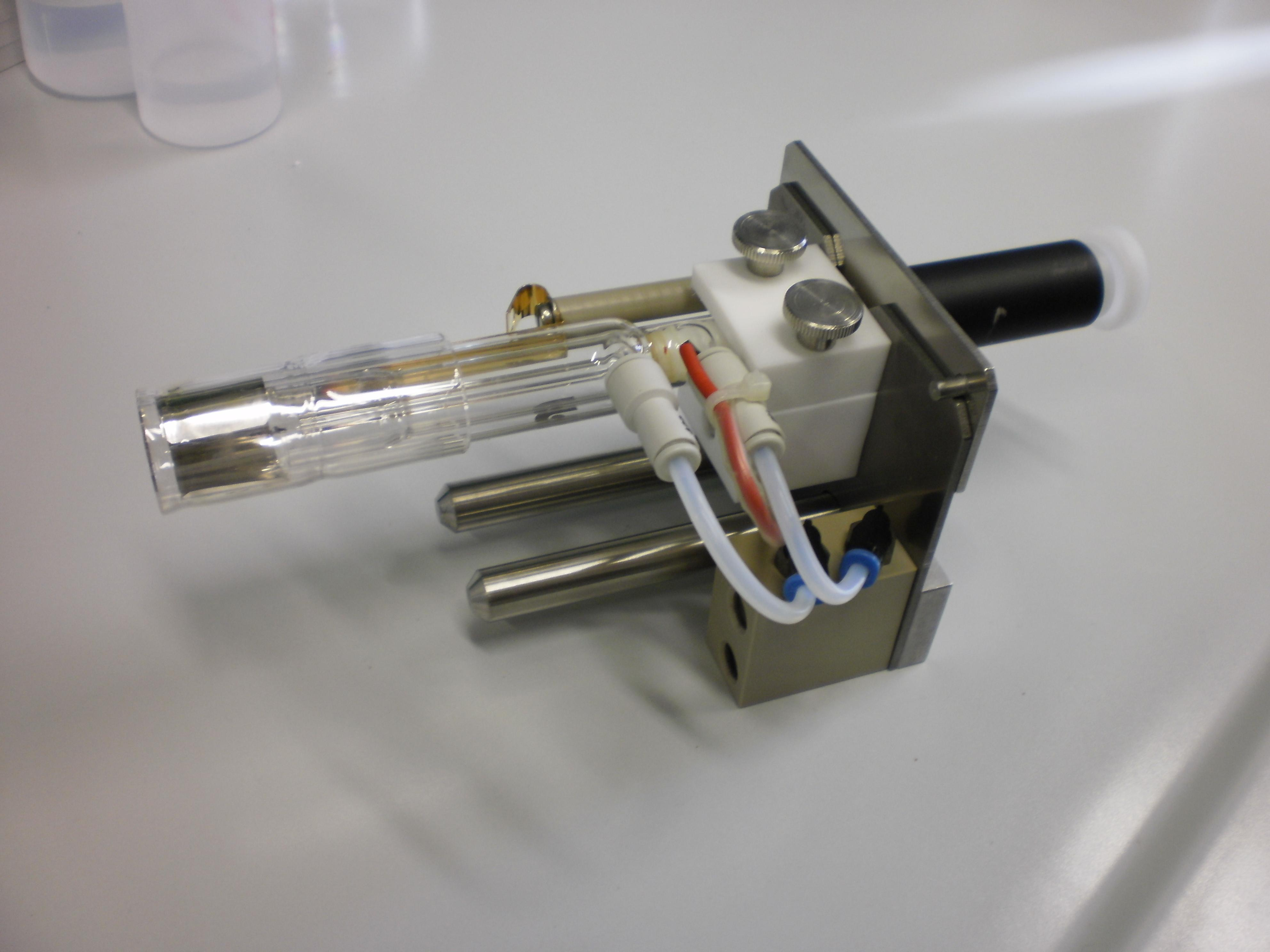
Sector field ICP-MS torch

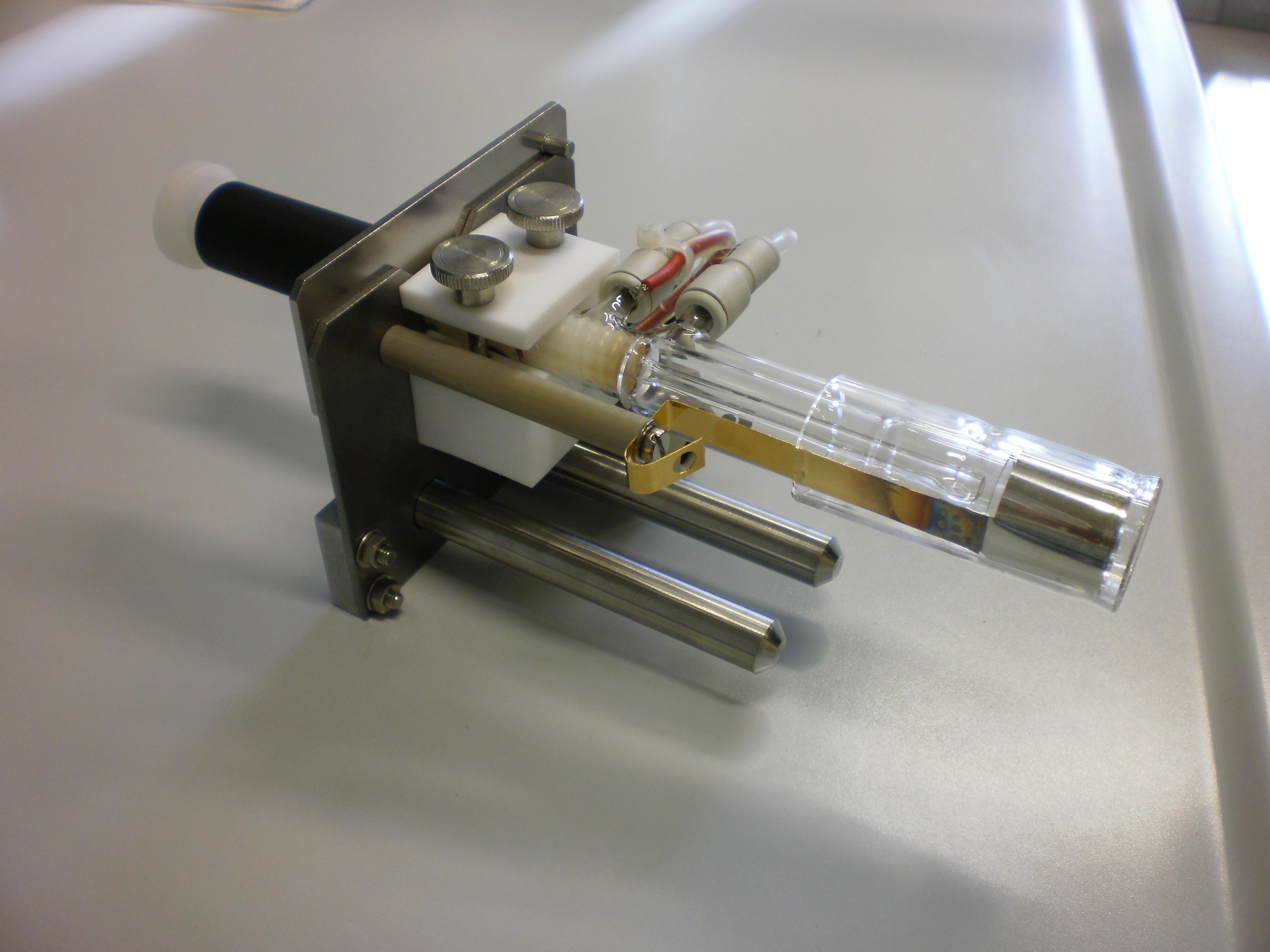
Sector field ICP-MS torch

== See also ==
- Plasma source
