= Hardfacing =

Metalworking process

Hardfacing is a metalworking process where harder or tougher material is applied to a base metal. It is welded to the base material, and generally takes the form of specialized electrodes for arc welding or filler rod for oxyacetylene and gas tungsten arc welding. Powder metal alloys are used in plasma-transferred arc (PTA), also called powder plasma welding, and thermal spray processes like high-velocity oxygen fuel coating, plasma spray, spray and fuse, etc. Submerged arc welding, flux core arc welding (FCAW) and metal inert gas (MIG) / metal active gas (MAG) use continuously fed wire varying in diameter depending on the process and current. The strip cladding process uses strips from 50 mm wide to 125 mm with a thickness of 0.5mm. Open arc welding uses a continuously fed tubular electrode which may or may not contain flux.

Hardfacing may be applied to a new part during production to increase its wear resistance, or it may be used to restore a worn-down surface. Hardfacing by arc welding is a surfacing operation to extend the service life of industrial components, preemptively on new components, or as part of a maintenance program. The result of significant savings in machine down time and production costs has meant that this process has been adopted across many industries such as steel, cement, mining, petrochemical, power, sugar cane and food. According to the results of an experimental study, the shielded metal arc welding and the gas metal arc welding hardfacing processes were effective in reducing the wear on the mouldboard ploughshare. With the shielded metal arc welding and gas metal arc welding hardfacing processes, the life span of the ploughshare was increased approximately 2 times.

Extensive work in research has resulted in the development of a wide range of alloys and welding procedures. The optimum alloy selection is made considering the component service conditions and feedback of the service performance.

For each industrial application and wear phenomena, there is a welding electrode to provide wear resistance.

Hardfacing can be deposited by various welding methods:

- Shielded metal arc welding
- Gas metal arc welding, including both gas-shielded and open arc welding
- Oxyfuel welding
- Submerged arc welding
- Electroslag welding
- Plasma arc welding, also called powder plasma welding
- Thermal spraying
- Cold polymer compounds
- Laser cladding
- Hardpaint

Commonly applied materials include cobalt-based alloys (such as Stellite), nickel-based alloys, chromium carbide alloys and NOREM. Hardfacing is sometimes followed by hot stamping to refinish the part or add color or instructional information to the part. Foils or films can be used for a metallic look or other protection.

== See also ==
- Case-hardening
