= Air carbon arc cutting =

Method of cutting metal with carbon arc heat

Air carbon arc cutting, also referred to as metal arc gouging, and previously as air arc cutting, is an arc cutting process where metal is cut and melted by the heat of a carbon arc. Molten metal is then removed by a blast of air. It employs a consumable carbon or graphite electrode to melt the material, which is then blown away by an air jet.

This process is useful for cutting a variety of materials, but it is most often used for cutting and gouging aluminum, copper, iron, magnesium, carbon and stainless steel. Because the metal is blown away by the air jet, it does not need to be oxidized. This process differs from plasma cutting operations because in air carbon cutting an open, unconstricted arc is used, and the arc operates separately from the air jet.

Air pressure for the jet usually varies from 60 to 100 psi (4-7 bar). The carbon electrode can be worn away by oxidation due to heat buildup. This can be reduced by coating the electrodes with copper.

As the sharpened carbon electrode is drawn along the metal, an arc forms and melts the metal. The air jet is used to blow away molten material. This can be dangerous, as the molten material can be blown substantial distances. The process is also very noisy. Metal removal is rapid, and when properly done, a smooth half-cylindrical cavity is created.

== See also ==
- Gas cutting
- Plasma cutting
