= Fulton J. Redman =

American politician and newspaper editor (1885–1969)

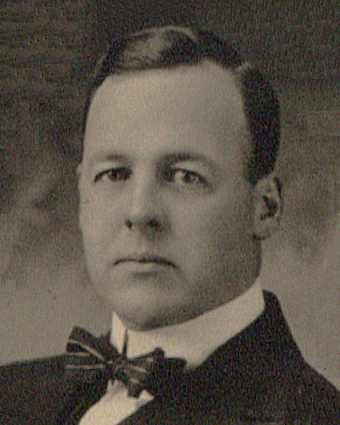
- Portrait of Redman, c. 1917

Member of the Maine House of Representatives from Hancock County
- In office January 3, 1917 – January 1, 1919
- Preceded by: Frank S. Lord
- Succeeded by: Fred L. Mason

Personal details
- Born: Fulton Jarvis Redman; March 12, 1885 Ellsworth, Maine, U.S.
- Died: September 11, 1969 (aged 84) Bar Harbor, Maine, U.S.
- Party: Democratic (1923–1969); Republican (until 1923)
- Spouse: Florence Murphy (m. 1914)
- Education: Bowdoin College (AB); Harvard University (LLB)

Fulton Jarvis Redman (March 12, 1885 – September 11, 1969) was an American lawyer, politician, and newspaper editor from Maine. He was born in Ellsworth and was elected as a Republican to a term in the Maine House of Representatives in 1916. He later switched to the Democratic Party and was one of the state organization's most prominent leaders during the first half of the 20th century. He was twice a delegate to the Democratic National Convention: first in 1924 and then in 1940. He ran for the U.S. Senate three times: in 1924 (against Bert M. Fernald), in 1926 (against Arthur R. Gould), and in 1942 (against Wallace H. White Jr.). He ran for Governor of Maine in 1940 and lost to Republican Sumner Sewall. He was also the publisher of the Portland Evening News.

He died in 1969 and is buried at Ellsworth's Woodbine Cemetery.

Party political offices
Preceded by Elmer E. Newbert	Democratic nominee for U.S. Senator from Maine (Class 2); 1924, 1926	Succeeded by Frank W. Haskell
Preceded by Louis J. Brann	Democratic nominee for Governor of Maine; 1940	Succeeded by George W. Lane Jr.
Preceded by Louis J. Brann	Democratic nominee for U.S. Senator from Maine (Class 2); 1942	Succeeded by Adrian H. Scolten
