= 1934 United States Senate election in Maine =

- September 10, 1934
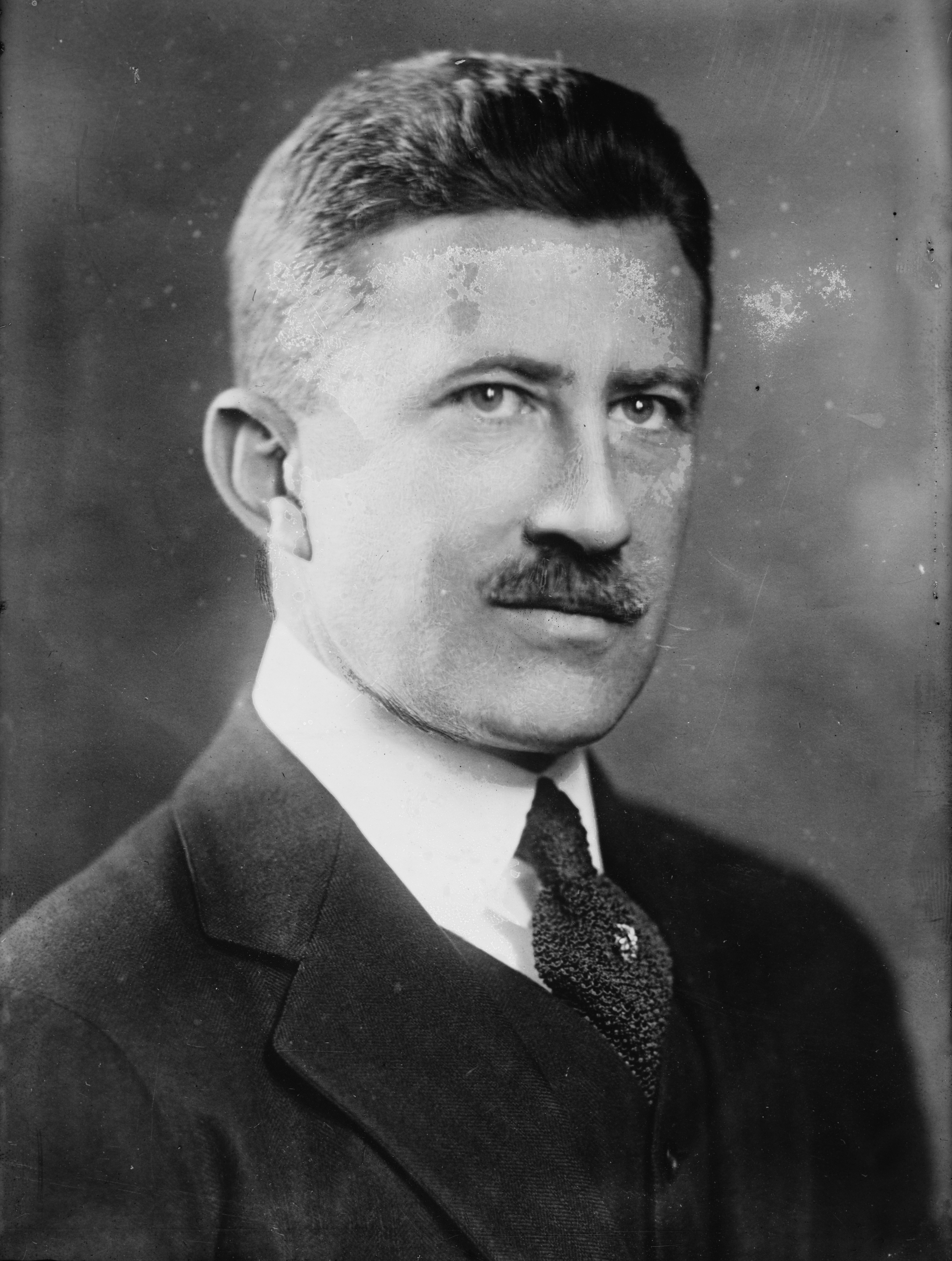

Nominee	Frederick Hale	Harold Dubord
Party	Republican	Democratic
Popular vote	139,773	138,573
Percentage	50.14%	49.71%
- County results Hale: 50–60% 60–70% Dubord: 50–60% 60–70%
U.S. senator before election
Frederick Hale
Republican
Elected U.S. Senator
Frederick Hale
Republican

The 1934 United States Senate election in Maine was held on September 10, 1934.

Incumbent Republican Senator Frederick Hale was narrowly re-elected to a fourth term in office over Democratic Waterville mayor F. Harold Dubord.

== Republican primary ==
=== Candidates ===
- Frederick Hale, incumbent Senator since 1917
- Louis A. Jack, former State Representative from Lisbon and President of the Maine Board of Trade

=== Results ===
1934 Republican U.S. Senate primary
Party	Candidate	Votes	%
Republican	Frederick Hale (incumbent)	61,141	76.70%
Republican	Louis A. Jack	18,578	23.30%
Total votes		79,719	100.00%

== Democratic primary ==
=== Candidates ===
- F. Harold Dubord, former Mayor of Waterville (1928–32)
- Clinton C. Stevens
- Paul C. Thurston

=== Results ===
1934 Democratic U.S. Senate primary
Party	Candidate	Votes	%
Democratic	F. Harold Dubord	15,743	54.03%
Democratic	Paul C. Thurston	10,153	34.84%
Democratic	Clinton C. Stevens	3,243	11.13%
Total votes		29,139	100.00%

== General election ==
=== Results ===
1934 U.S. Senate election in Maine
Party	Candidate	Votes	%	±%
Republican	Frederick Hale (incumbent)	139,773	50.14%	▼19.50
Democratic	F. Harold Dubord	138,573	49.71%	▲19.35
Communist	Lewis Gordon	422	0.15%	N/A
Total votes		278,768	100.00%	

== See also ==
- 1934 United States Senate elections
