= 1924 United States Senate election in Maine =

- September 8, 1924
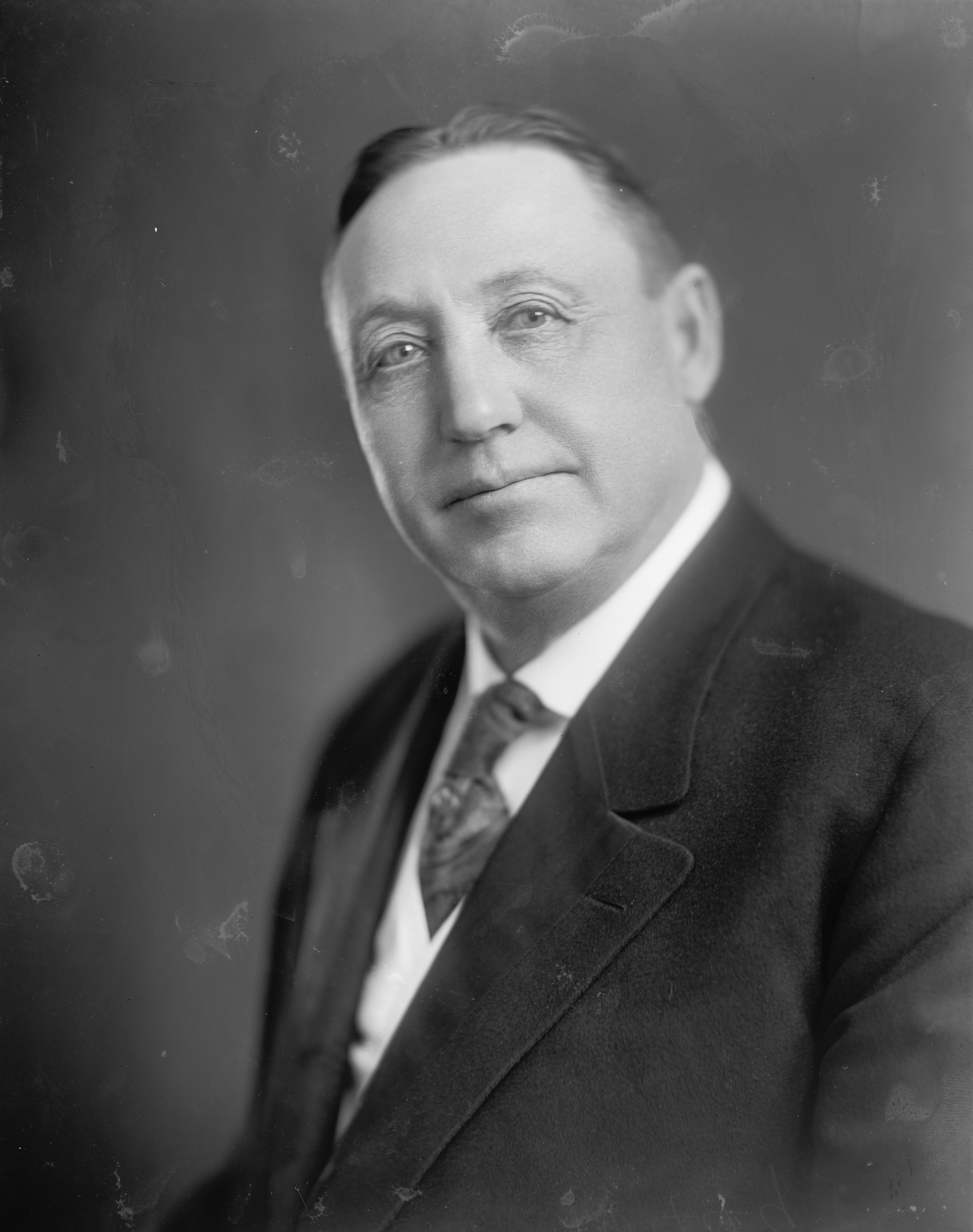

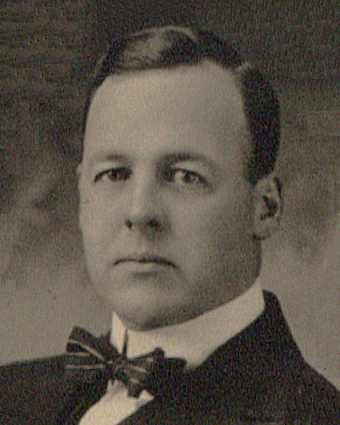
Nominee	Bert Fernald	Fulton J. Redman
Party	Republican	Democratic
Popular vote	148,783	97,428
Percentage	60.43%	39.57%
- County results Fernald: 50–60% 60–70%
U.S. senator before election
Bert Fernald
Republican
Elected U.S. Senator
Bert Fernald
Republican

The 1924 United States Senate election in Maine was held on September 8, 1924. Incumbent Republican U.S. Senator Bert Fernald overcame a challenge from U.S. Representative Frank E. Guernsey in the Republican primary. In the general election, Fernald was re-elected to a second term in office over Democratic newspaperman Fulton J. Redman.

== Republican primary ==
=== Candidates ===
- Bert Fernald, incumbent senator since 1916
- Frank E. Guernsey, former U.S. Representative from Dover
- Louis A. Jack, former president of the Maine Board of Trade and candidate for governor in 1920

=== Results ===
1924 Republican U.S. Senate primary
Party	Candidate	Votes	%
Republican	Bert Fernald (inc.)	38,590	45.41%
Republican	Frank E. Guernsey	29,938	35.23%
Republican	Louis A. Jack	16,452	19.36%
Total votes		84,980	100.00%

== Democratic primary ==
=== Candidates ===
- Fulton J. Redman, newspaper editor and former state representative from Bar Harbor

=== Results ===
Redman was unopposed for the Democratic nomination.

1924 Democratic U.S. Senate primary
Party	Candidate	Votes	%
Democratic	Fulton J. Redman	12,879	99.92%
Write-in	All others	11	0.09%
Total votes		12,890	100.00%

== General election ==
=== Results ===
1924 U.S. Senate election in Maine
Party	Candidate	Votes	%	±%
Republican	Bert Fernald (inc.)	148,783	60.43%	▲5.03
Democratic	Fulton J. Redman	97,428	39.57%	▼5.03
Total votes		246,211	100.00%	

== See also ==
- 1924 United States Senate elections
