= Good Heart =

Good Heart may refer to:

- A Good Heart, 1985 song recorded by Feargal Sharkey
- Good Heart Specialist Hospital, Port Harcourt, Nigeria
- The Good Heart, 2009 film

== See also ==
- Goodheart, a surname (with a list of people of this name)
