= Lisbon High School =

Lisbon High School may refer to the following schools in the United States:

- Lisbon High School (Iowa), Lisbon, Iowa
- Lisbon High School (Maine), Lisbon Falls, Maine
- Lisbon High School (North Dakota), Lisbon, North Dakota
