= 1930 United States Senate election in Maine =

- September 8, 1930
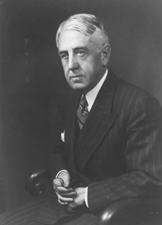

| Nominee | Wallace White | Frank Haskell |
| Party | Republican | Democratic |
| Popular vote | 88,262 | 56,559 |
| Percentage | 60.95% | 39.05% |
- County results White: 50–60% 60–70% 70–80%
U.S. senator before election
Arthur Gould
Republican
Elected U.S. Senator
Wallace H. White Jr.
Republican

The 1930 United States Senate election in Maine was held on September 8, 1930. Incumbent Republican U.S. Senator Arthur Gould, who had been elected to complete the term of the late Senator Bert Fernald, did not run for re-election to a full term.

In the Republican primary, U.S. Representative Wallace H. White Jr. defeated former Governor of Maine Owen Brewster. White easily won the general election over Democrat Frank Haskell.

White and Brewster would later serve together as Senate colleagues from 1941 to 1949.

== Republican primary ==
=== Candidates ===
- Owen Brewster, former Governor of Maine from 1925 to 1929
- Dugald B. Dewar
- Wallace H. White Jr., U.S. Representative from Lewiston

=== Results ===
1930 Republican U.S. Senate primary
| Party | Candidate | Votes | % |
|---|---|---|---|
| Republican | Wallace H. White Jr. | 46,904 | 50.17% |
| Republican | Owen Brewster | 39,489 | 42.24% |
| Republican | Dugald Dewar | 7,098 | 7.59% |
| Write-in | All others | 2 | 0.00% |
| Total votes | | 89,183 | 100.00% |

== Democratic primary ==
=== Candidates ===
- Frank Haskell, candidate for U.S. Representative from Portland in 1920

=== Results ===
Haskell was unopposed for the Democratic nomination.

1930 Democratic U.S. Senate primary
| Party | Candidate | Votes | % |
|---|---|---|---|
| Democratic | Frank H. Haskell | 25,598 | 99.57% |
| Write-in | All others | 22 | 0.43% |
| Total votes | | 25,598 | 100.00% |

== General election ==
=== Results ===
1930 U.S. Senate election in Maine
| Party | Candidate | Votes | % | ±% |
|---|---|---|---|---|
| Republican | Wallace H. White Jr. | 88,262 | 60.95% | ▼10.85 |
| Democratic | Frank H. Haskell | 56,559 | 39.05% | ▲10.85 |
| Total votes | | 147,821 | 100.00% | |

== See also ==
- 1930 United States Senate elections
