= Howard Gerrish =

American writer (1910–1988)

Howard H. Gerrish (December 10, 1910 – June 12, 1988) was a writer and teacher whose influence extended widely through the technology and electronics community of the early 1960s-80s. He authored and co-authored numerous books that taught, and continue to teach, electronics. He taught for twenty-four years at three California State Colleges/Universities: Chico, San Jose and Humboldt. He was born in Lisbon, Maine.

== Written works include ==
- 1961 Electricity—A Build-a-Course unit as well as 1961 Electronics—A Build-a-Course. Written while an assistant professor, Industrial Arts, Chico State College
- Electricity and Electronics, 1964. Written when an associate professor at San Jose State College—in the acknowledgments he notes faculty and support from his years at Chico State
- "Modern general shop; four complete general shop books combined in one volume," with others, 1964:

Brown, Walter Charles, Drafting, Wagner, Willis H. Woodworking, Boyd, T. Gardner. Metalworking, Gerrish, Howard H. Electricity. Goodheart - Willcox, 1965 [c1964]

- "Learning experiences in transistors and semiconductors; teaches modern concepts"

Publisher: Farmingdale, N.J. : Buck Engineering Co., 1968

- Gerrish's Technical Dictionary, 1968

== Career ==
Gerrish served as a captain in the US Army during World War II — Arrivals noted in the Field Artillery Journal, May 1945, include 1st Lt. Howard H. Gerrish, Department of Air Training. He graduated from the University of Michigan in 1946 and earned his Master's from Wayne State in 1953. He started teaching at San Jose State in 1961 in Industrial Arts at SJSU. He worked at Humboldt State, 1969–1972, where they named a lab for him, the Gerrish Electronics Laboratory, Jenkins Hall. He retired in 1972.

In addition, he was an avid organ player, starting by playing the background music in silent movie theaters. He built and operated his own "Ham Radio" station. Upon retirement, he and his wife, Virtue, lived in Sedona, Arizona.
