= Goodhart =

Goodhart is a surname. Notable people with the surname include:

== Arts and entertainment ==
- Al Goodhart (1905–1955), American composer
- Arthur Murray Goodhart (1866–1941), British composer and organist
- Harry Stuart Goodhart-Rendel (1887–1959), English architect and writer

== Politics ==
- Philip Goodhart (1925–2015), British Conservative politician
- William Goodhart, Baron Goodhart (1933–2017), British politician and human rights lawyer

== Sport ==
- Brian Goodhart (1913–2003), Australian footballer
- Harry Goodhart (1858–1895), English footballer and academic

== Other fields ==
- Arthur Goodhart Altschul (1920–2002), American banker
- Arthur Lehman Goodhart (1891–1978), American-born British academic jurist and lawyer
- Charles Goodhart (born 1936), British economist, son of Arthur Lehman
- David Goodhart (born 1956), British editor
- James Goodhart (1845–1916), English physician and paediatrician
- Nicholas Goodhart (1919–2011), British test pilot

== See also ==
- Goodheart, a surname
- Goodhart's law ("When a measure becomes a target, it ceases to be a good measure")
- Goodhart Newbury Manflier, a human-powered aircraft designed by Nicholas Goodhart
- Goedhart, Dutch spelling of the surname
