= Lisbon Community School =

Coordinates: 44°1′21″N 70°5′17″W

- Lisbon, Maine; United States

Information
- Type: Public
- School district: Lisbon School Department
- Principal: Lori Cloutier
- Grades: Pre-K–5
- Website: lisboncs.ss16.sharpschool.com

Lisbon Community School is a public elementary school serving students in pre-kindergarten through fifth grade in Lisbon, Maine. The school is part of the Lisbon School Department and provides early childhood and primary education for students in the Town of Lisbon.

As of the 2024–2025 school year, the school's principal is Lori Cloutier.

Prior to 2007, the school served students in grades K–6 before transitioning to an eventual Pre-K–5 grade configuration as part of district-wide organizational changes.
