= Lisbon School Department =

School district in Maine, United States

- 19 Gartley Street Lisbon, Maine, 04250

Other information
- Website: www.lisbonschoolsme.org

Lisbon School Department is a school district in Lisbon Falls, Androscoggin County, Maine, United States. It provides primary and secondary education to an administrative district of Maine known as Union 30.

== Schools ==
- Lisbon Community School
- Philip W Sugg Middle School
- Lisbon High School

== See also ==
- List of school districts in Maine
