= TIP TIG =

Subset of Gas Tungsten Arc Welding

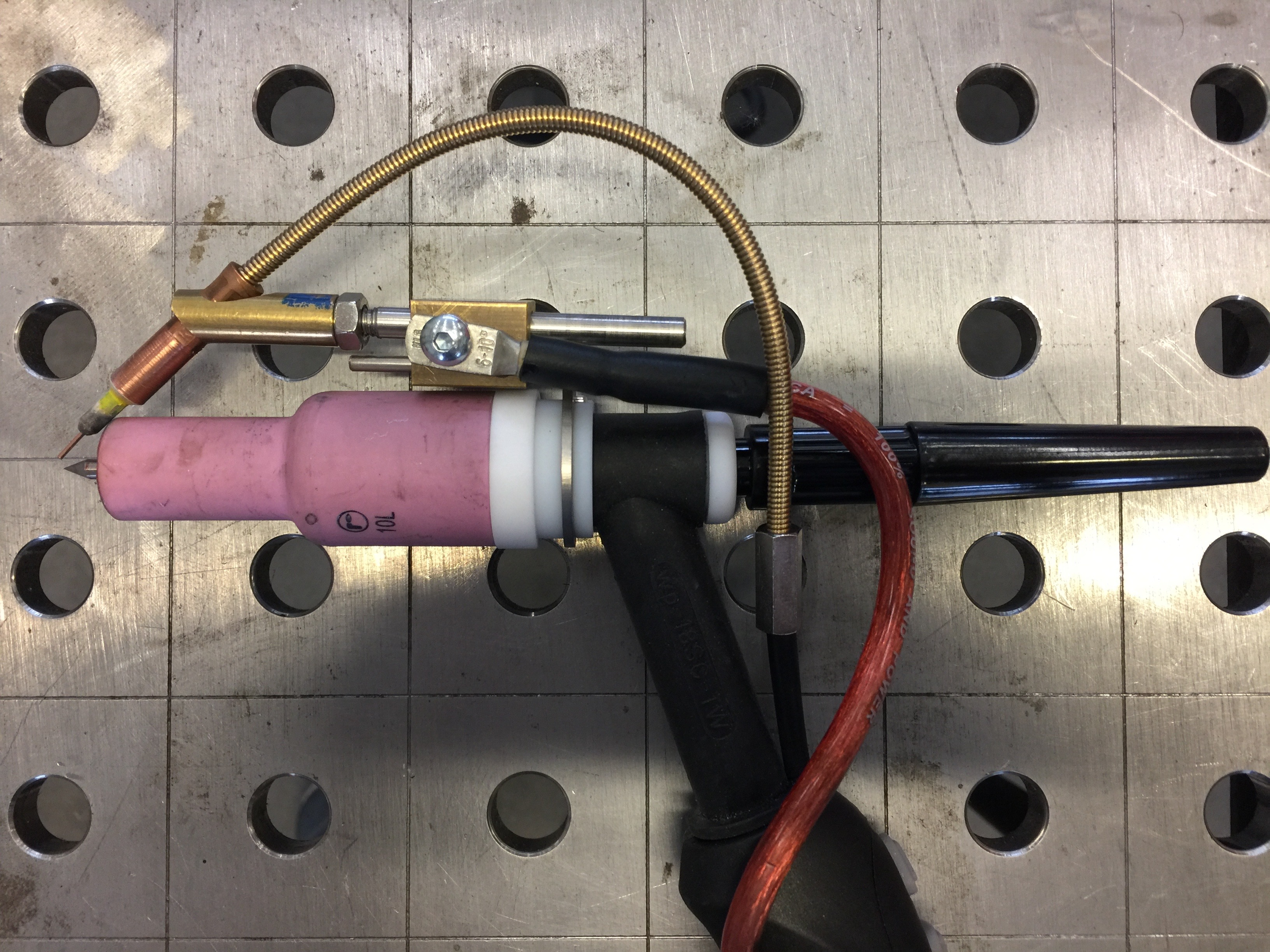
TIP TIG welding torch

TIP TIG is a subset of gas tungsten arc welding (GTAW), using a mechanism called filler wire agitation to enhance molten weld pool dynamics. This agitation has been found to enhance the weld puddle fluidity and release evolving gases, reducing the chances of inclusions and porosity, and also separate impurities.

Welding systems that employ the TIP TIG method are in fact GTAW systems, simply wire fed, that additionally induce a vibratory effect on the wire and apply hot wire current on the filler metal before it even enters the weld pool. The vibration comes from a linear forward and backward motion applied mechanically using a custom wire feeder system. A secondary power, on the other hand, creates the hot wire current.

The TIP TIG process was invented and patented 1999 by the Austrian engineer, Siegfried Plasch with the intention of a higher deposition rate compared to the regular GTAW process.
