= Hannah Hanson Kinney =

American seamstress

- Born: Hannah Hanson; 1805; Lisbon, Maine
- Died: Unknown
- Occupation: Seamstress
- Known for: Allegedly murdering two husbands and one Father-in-law
- Spouses: Ward Witham, Enoch W. Freeman, George Kinney
- Children: 4
- Status: Acquitted
- Criminal charge: Murder
- Penalty: None

Details
- Imprisoned at: 4 months, 1840

Hannah Hanson Kinney (born Hannah Hanson in 1805) was an American seamstress who was charged with the murder of her third husband, George Kinney in 1840. Arsenic, the alleged murder weapon, was found in Kinney's stomach during an autopsy. Though Kinney was acquitted, public records indicate that Kinney's second husband, Reverend Enoch W. Freeman, and Freeman's father, died of arsenic poisoning years earlier. Public consensus following Kinney's trial deemed her guilty, and she published an autobiography in 1841 to defend herself.

== Early life and marriage to Ward Witham ==
Hannah Hanson was born in 1805 in Lisbon, Maine. At seventeen, she met Ward Witham, and they were married in January 1822, in Portland, Maine. After the first few months of their marriage, Hanson was accused by two neighbors, Mr. and Mrs. Weymouth, of stealing their personal items. Witham defended his wife at the time, but later suspected her in the theft when he came to believe that she had been involved in an extra-marital affair. In October 1822, Hanson and Witham moved out of the home they had shared with the Weymouth family. In July 1823, Hanson gave birth to her first child, a daughter. Witham came to suspect Hanson had been involved in an affair during the winter of 1824. In 1825, Hanson gave birth to her second child, a son. In the winter of 1825, Witham worked outside the home gathering lumber. He suspected his wife was involved in a second affair, this time with a young man. Rozilla Moody, a ward of the Witham family, signed an affidavit in 1826 saying she had witnessed another man in the Witham household during the previous winter.

In 1826, Witham moved Hanson and their two children from Portland to Dover, Maine. Witham moved to Boston on his own, and stayed there for two years. Hanson heard that Witham had begun a new life in Boston as a single man. In 1830, Witham and Hanson exchanged letters confirming that Hanson had no desire to live with her husband again. Later that year, Hanson moved to Boston without her children. In March 1832, Hanson and Witham legally divorced on the grounds of adultery, and full custody of their children was awarded to Hanson. Records at the time of their divorce indicate they had four children in total.

== Marriage to Enoch W. Freeman ==
Hanson began supporting herself as a seamstress in Boston. She visited her children in Dover several times a year. In July 1832, Hanson visited her cousin, Reverend Enoch W. Freeman, minister of the First Baptist Church in Lowell, MA. It was the first time Hanson had seen Freeman in fifteen years. In 1835, against the wishes of Freeman's congregation, Hanson and Freeman were married. On the first anniversary of their wedding, Freeman grew ill and died. He was thirty-seven years old. Following Freeman's death, Hanson was forced to leave town by the suspicious citizens of Lowell.

== Marriage to George Kinney ==
Hanson returned to Boston and married her third husband, George Kinney on November 26, 1836. Kinney was a known gambler and drunkard, and was five years Hannah's junior. His business collapsed soon after the wedding, and Hannah began supporting her husband and then three children through her work as a seamstress. In 1840, Kinney was treated for syphilis, which he had contracted through a sexual affair with a mistress. On August 9, 1840, Kinney drank a cup of herbal tea and died painfully afterward.

== Trial ==
On August 30, 1840, Hannah was visiting friends in Thetford, Vermont when she was arrested for the murder of George Kinney and transported back to Boston. Hannah was held in prison for four months awaiting trial. According to Hannah's autobiography, she lived in cell number 5 in the common jail. The cause of death on Kinney's autopsy read arsenic poisoning. During the investigation, Rev. Freeman's body was exhumed, and it was revealed on record that his stomach, too, had contained arsenic before his death.

Hannah Kinney's trial began on December 21, 1840. Hannah's defense attorneys, Franklin Dexter and George T. Curtis, argued that no proof had been found of Hannah purchasing and administering poison to Kinney. The prosecution called as a witness a servant who worked in the Kinney household. She reported seeing a piece of paper in the kitchen with "poison" written on it, but the testimony was deemed too weak to convict Hannah. During the trial, it was confirmed that Kinney had been treated for syphilis immediately before his death, and arsenic was a well-known medication prescribed to treat venereal disease at the time.

During the trial, eighteen witnesses were interrogated by the prosecution, including Dr. Martin Gay, a Boston physician who confirmed the presence of arsenic in the late Kinney's stomach, Thomas G. Bradford, a local shopkeeper who sold arsenic but couldn't identify Hannah as a customer, and Mrs. Aurelia Bingham, Hannah's seamstress apprentice. The defense interrogated twenty two additional witnesses, including Earnest H. Cheetham and Thomas Ridley, Boston citizens who described the rumors about Hannah's guilt, Albert G. Leach, Hannah's brother-in-law and Mr. Coolidge, the local jailor who had once imprisoned the late Mr. Kinney for unpaid debts.

On December 25, 1840, Hannah Hanson Kinney was acquitted of the murder charge and released from prison. The jury took a total of three minutes to deliberate on a verdict. She sold off her millinery shop to cover her late husband's gambling debts, which totaled $2,000. Once the debt was settled, Hannah was left with $89 in total. Hannah's brother-in-law, Albert Leach, who had visited her while in prison, mortgaged his horse and carriage to get Hannah and her three children back on their feet financially.

=== Public opinion ===
The public in Boston and Lowell continued to attribute Kinney and Freeman's deaths to Hannah despite the court declaring her not guilty, and rumors had even begun to attribute the death of Freeman's father to Hannah as well. Hannah's father-in-law, Mr. Freeman had died suddenly while Hannah and Freeman had been visiting him following their wedding. In 1841, Hannah published her autobiography, A Review of the Principal Events of the Last Ten Years in the Life of Mrs. Hannah Kinney: Together with Some Comments upon the Late Trial, Written by Herself to combat rumors of her guilt. In response, her ex-husband Ward Witham, published a biography of Hannah, entitled Life of Mrs. H. Kinney, for Twenty Years in 1842. He accused her of adultery and slander.

In 1868, The Republican, a Springfield, Massachusetts newspaper, mentioned Hannah Hanson as "Hannah Kinney, supposed to have poisoned the Rev Mr Freeman, her second husband, as well as Kinney, her third." The Spectator compared Hannah to other women who had infamously used poison or violence to murder men, including Madame LeFarge of France and Mrs. Cutts of England.

In 1989, a publication on New England genealogical records argued that Hanson had attempted to convince the doctors conducting Kinney's autopsy to cite cholera as the cause of death.
