= Goodheart =

Goodheart is an English surname. Notable people with the surname include:

- Carol D. Goodheart, American psychologist
- George Goodheart (1918–2008), American chiropractor
- Steve Goodheart, American college baseball coach

== See also ==
- Good Heart (disambiguation)
- Goodheart–Willcox, an American book publishing company
- Goodhart, a surname (with a list of people of this name)
