= Goedhart =

Goedhart is a Dutch surname. Notable people with the surname include:

- Ed Goedhart (born 1962), American politician
- Frans Goedhart (1904–1990), Dutch journalist and politician
- Gerrit Jan van Heuven Goedhart (1901–1956), Dutch politician
- Jan Goedhart (1893–1975), Dutch painter

== See also ==
- Goodhart
