= Beverly Prosser Gelwick =

American psychologist (1932–2023)

- Beverly Prosser, later Gelwick, from a 1955 newspaper
- Born: Beverly Ann Prosser; September 6, 1932; Lewiston, Maine
- Died: July 21, 2023 (age 90); Cundy's Harbor, Maine
- Occupation: Psychologist

Beverly Ann Prosser Gelwick (September 6, 1932 – July 21, 2023) was an American psychologist. She founded the counseling program at Stephens College, and was director of counseling services at the University of New Hampshire and at Bowdoin College. She held national leadership positions in professional organizations in her field.

== Early life and education ==
Prosser was born in Lewiston, Maine, the daughter of Edward E. Prosser and Beulah Morrison Prosser. Her father was a teacher. She graduated from Lisbon High School in 1950, and earned a bachelor's degree from Temple University and the American Baptist Institute for Christian Workers in 1955. She earned a master's degree in education in 1971, and a Ph.D. in psychology in 1975, both from the University of Missouri.

== Career ==
As a young wife and mother, Gelwick lived in Berkeley, California, and she was a student at the Pacific School of Religion. She was a church soloist and choir director in those years. The Gelwicks directed a YMCA girls' camp in California in the early 1960s.

After earning graduate degrees, Gelwick was the founding director of student counseling at Stephens College. At Stephens she received the college's Outstanding Advising Award in 1981. She was director of counseling services at the University of New Hampshire from 1983 to 1988, and at Bowdoin College from 1988 to 1997. Her research interests included women as nontraditional college students, math anxiety, and eating disorders.

From 1979 to 1985, Gelwick was president of the college and University Accreditation Board of the International Association of Counseling Centers (IACC). She was also president of the International Association of Counseling Services. She was a visiting lecturer at the University of Reading in 1972 and 1973, and taught a course on eating disorders at Teachers College, Columbia University in 1982. She held national leadership roles in the American College Personnel Association in the 1980s.

In retirement, Gelwick remained active in support of women's educational opportunities and other social causes.

== Publications ==
- "Training Faculty to Do Career Advising" (1974)
- Up the Ladder: Women, Professionals, and Clients in College Student Personnel (1979)
- "Student Development and the Older Student" (1979)
- "Research on a workshop to reduce the effects of sexism and sex role socialization on women's career planning" (1980, with James M. O'Neil, Carroll Ohlde, Charles Barke, and Nancy Garfield)
- "Men’s Lives: Toward A Proactive Sex Role Intervention For Men and Women" (1981, with P. P. Heppner)
- "Accreditation Guidelines for University and College Counseling Services" (1982, with eight other authors)
- "The Definition and Prevalence of Bulimia" (1983, with M. K. Hamilton and C. J. Meade)
- "Cognitive Development of Women" (1985)
- "Counseling and Psychotherapy With College Men" (1988, with Kenneth F. Garni)

== Personal life ==
Prosser married Richard Lee Gelwick, a clergyman and college professor, in 1955. They had two children, Jennifer and Allen. Her husband died in 2014, and she died in 2023, at the age of 90, at the village of Cundy's Harbor in Harpswell, Maine. She is honored with a brick in the Plaza of Heroines at Iowa State University.

A few weeks before her death, Gelwick learned that the remains of her cousin Stanley Willis Allen, who died at Pearl Harbor, had been identified and would be returned to the family in Maine.
