= Woodbine Cemetery =

Coordinates: 44°33′12″N 68°23′46″W

Woodbine Cemetery is an historic cemetery in Ellsworth, Maine, United States.

In the late 2000s, efforts were made by community residents to improve the cemetery.

== Notable burials ==
- Eugene Hale, U.S. Senator (1881–1911)
- Frederick Hale, U.S. Senator (1917–1941)
- Phillips Lord, radio program writer
- John A. Peters, U.S. Congressman (1913–1922)
- Fulton J. Redman, state representative, lawyer, and newspaper editor
