= George W. Lane Jr. =

American politician and banker

George W. Lane Jr. (November 15, 1880 – April 9, 1963) was an American banker and political candidate. Lane was a well-known businessperson in Lewiston, Maine as head of the Lewiston Trust Company. In 1942, Lane was the Maine Democratic Party's candidate for Governor of Maine against incumbent Sumner Sewall. Lane lost in a two-way race with 33.16% of the vote. He was also a member of the first City Council of Auburn, Maine in 1924 as well as on the board of the Auburn Water District.

He was the Treasurer of Bates College, in Lewiston, Maine. The administration building there was named after him.

Party political offices
Preceded by Fulton J. Redman	Democratic nominee for Governor of Maine; 1942	Succeeded by Paul J. Jullien
