= Nina Lumbard =

American painter (1876–1972)

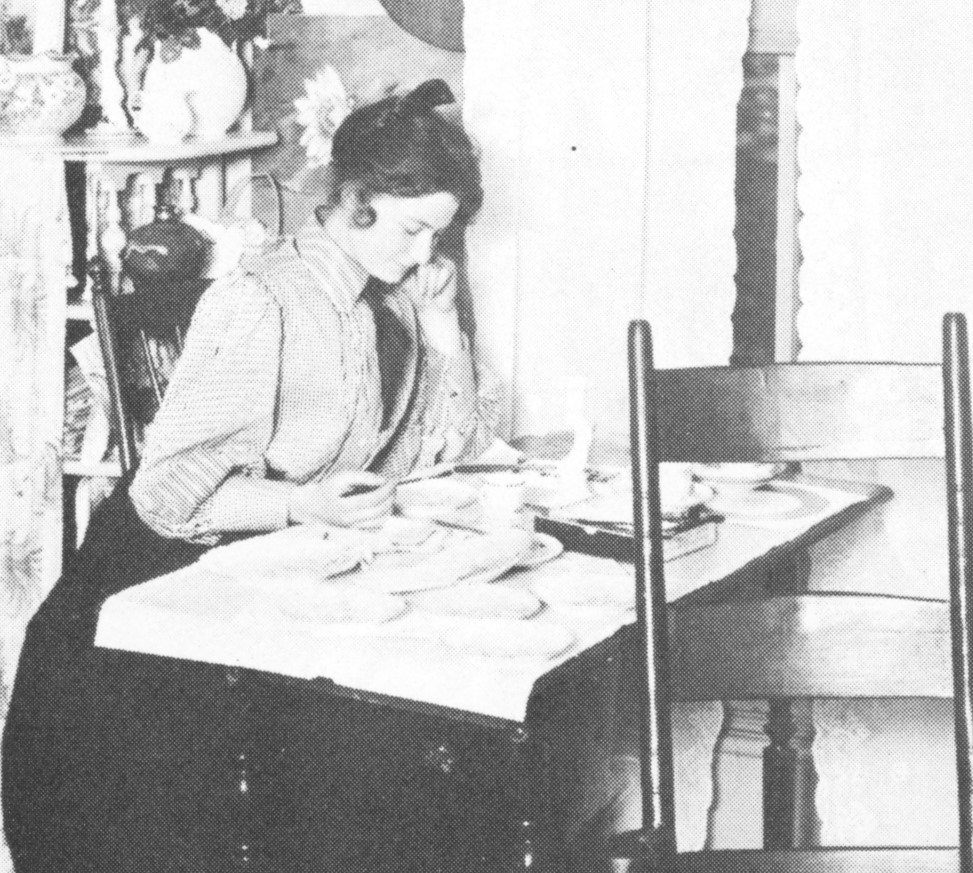
- Lumbard in 1899
- Born: August 14, 1876; Fremont, Nebraska, U.S.
- Died: December 4, 1972 (aged 96); Scottsdale, Arizona, U.S.
- Resting place: Mount Auburn Cemetery in Auburn, Maine
- Known for: China painting
- Spouses: Ralph M. Lunn; (1903–1916, his death); Wallace H. White; (1917–1952, his death)

Nina Evangeline Lumbard (August 14, 1876 – December 4, 1972) was an American ceramic painter, illustrator, and teacher who worked in Fremont and Omaha, Nebraska, during the late nineteenth century. During her brief career, she exhibited at the Chicago World's Fair and Trans-Mississippi Exposition, taught at the Omaha Art Institute, and illustrated a multitude of local publications.

== Early life ==
Nina was born on August 14, 1876, in Fremont, Nebraska, to Dwight and Mary Lumbard, a banker and housewife. Nina had three brothers, the youngest of whom was shot and killed by a friend while hunting ducks.

The Lumbard family was active in the Fremont community and practicing members of the local Methodist church. Nina's mother, in particular, was very involved with a number of Fremont's women's clubs where she practiced music, painting, and needlework. Like her mother, Nina was also a member of a myriad of clubs and participated in local fairs, winning awards for her fruit preserves, pickles, and paintings in ceramic, oil, and watercolor.

== Artistic career ==
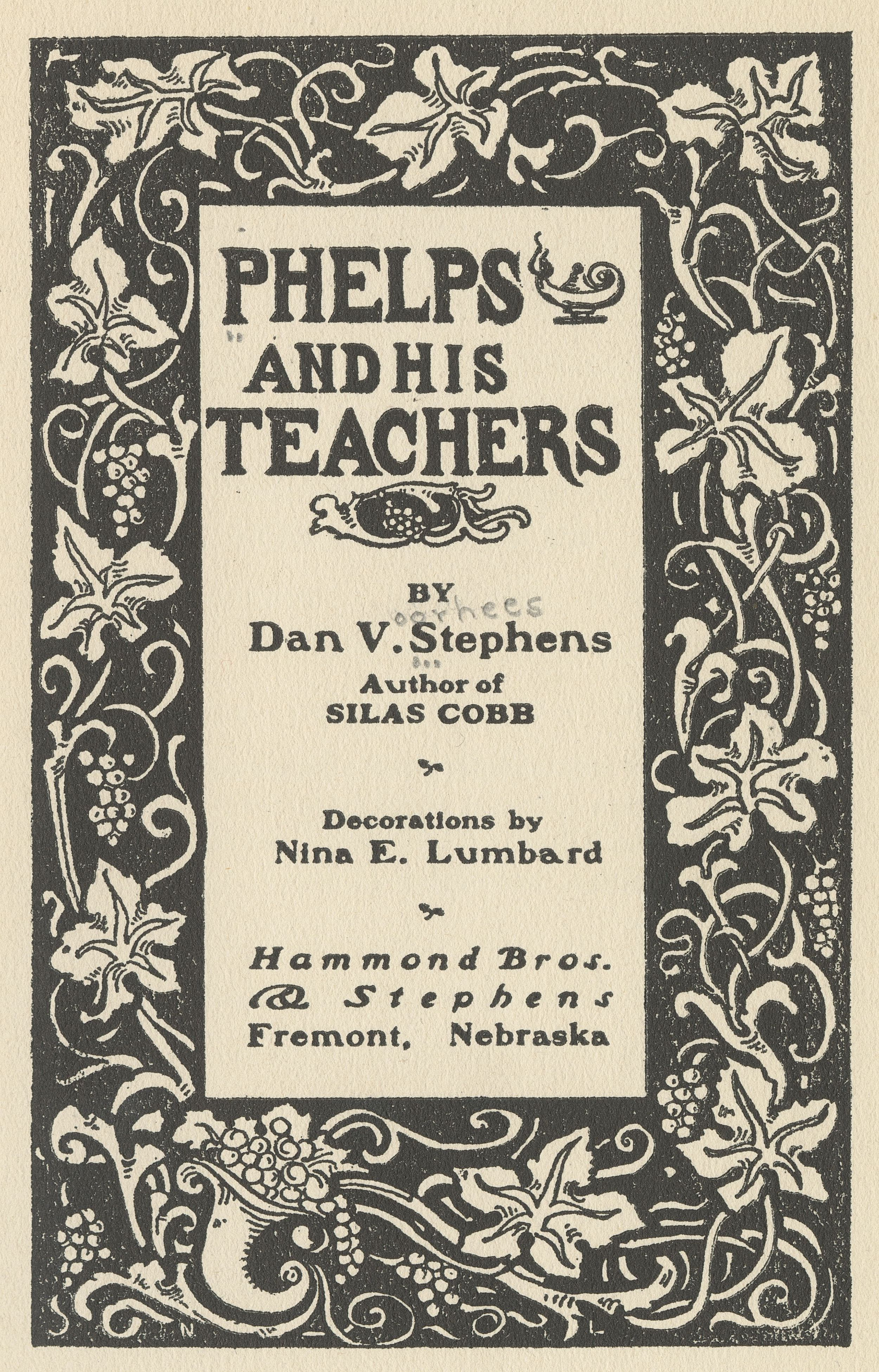
Nina Lumbard, Phelps and His Teachers cover page illustration, 1901

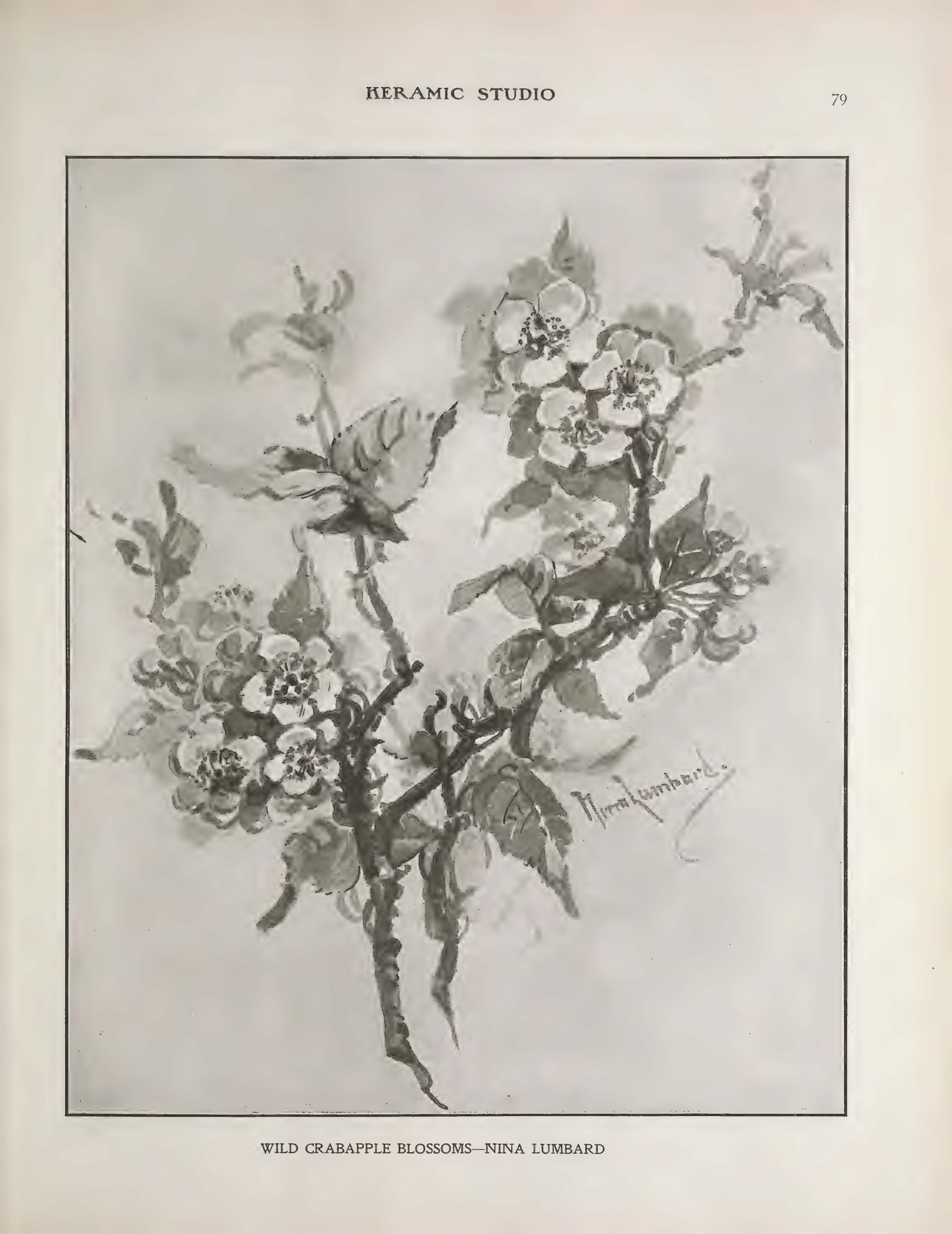
Nina Lumbard, Wild Crabapple Blossoms, published in Keramic Studio, August 1903

In 1893, at sixteen years of age, Nina exhibited four painted ceramics at the Chicago World's Fair. Two of her porcelain paintings, one of Psyche and the other of the Madonna and Child, were displayed on the wall of the ladies' parlor in the Nebraska building, a room decorated by women artists from the state. With the Nebraska Ceramic Club, she displayed two additional ceramic works in the Woman's Building as part of an exhibition of various organizations headed by women in the United States.

Over the next few years, Nina exhibited regularly on her own and with the Nebraska Ceramic Club. She also offered private instruction in ceramic painting and gave lectures on the topic at various local women's clubs. During the winters, she traveled to New York, where she undertook art and design lessons, in addition to occasionally traveling to Europe for the same purpose.

In 1898, Nina Lumbard, then well-known in the Omaha area, was called upon to assist in designing the Nebraska building for the Trans-Mississippi Exposition. Within the building, two of her works were displayed.

The following year, Nina opened a studio in the new Omaha Art Institute, housed within A. Hospe's music and art store, where she served as an art instructor. In addition to teaching ceramic painting, Nina, who had recently started illustrating local publications, taught courses on drawing and design.

== Personal life ==
On January 1, 1903, Nina married Ralph Lunn, a shoe salesman for the Auburn-Lynn Shoe Manufacturing Company. Following their honeymoon, the couple moved to Auburn, Maine, where the company headquarters were located. Nina and Ralph had two children. At the age of 36, Ralph died on March 24, 1916. Tragedy struck again in August 1917, when Nina's father died while in her care.

Shortly after her father's death, on November 1, 1917, Nina married Wallace H. White, the incoming Republican congressman for the second district of Maine. Throughout his three-decade-long career, Nina took on the duties of a political wife and was affectionately referred to as "Madame Senator." After Wallace retired in 1949 and his health began to deteriorate, Nina took care of him until he died on March 31, 1952.

== Death ==
On December 4, 1972, Nina died at age 97 in Scottsdale, Arizona, where she was residing at the time.
