= Mount Pleasant Cemetery (Bangor, Maine) =

Catholic cemetery in Portland, Maine

- Interactive map of Mount Pleasant Cemetery

Details
- Established: 1854
- Location: Bangor, Maine
- Country: United States
- Coordinates: 44°48′47″N 68°47′27″W
- Owned by: Roman Catholic Diocese of Portland
- Size: 69 acres (28 ha)
- No. of graves: >17,000
- Website: Official website
- Find a Grave: Mount Pleasant Cemetery

Mount Pleasant Cemetery (also known as Mount Pleasant Catholic Cemetery) is a cemetery in Bangor, Maine. Established as Bangor's Roman Catholic burial ground in 1854, it originally included 14 acres. It now includes over 69 acres.

The need for a primarily Roman Catholic burial ground arose from a rapid influx of Irish Catholic immigrants to Bangor in the 1850s and onward. Many Roman Catholic residents from nearby Buck Street Cemetery were re-interred at Mount Pleasant as well.

== Notable interments ==
- Myrna Fahey (1933–1973), actress
- Arthur R. Gould (1857–1946), U.S. Senator from Maine
- Edward C. O'Leary (1920–2002), Bishop of Portland
