= Lisbon (CDP), Maine =

Lisbon, Maine
- Census-designated place
- Location within Maine Location within the United States
- Coordinates: 44°01′42″N 70°07′12″W
- Country: United States
- State: Maine
- County: Androscoggin
- Town: Lisbon

Area
  - Total: 3.54 sq mi (9.16 km^{2})
  - Land: 3.45 sq mi (8.94 km^{2})
  - Water: 0.081 sq mi (0.21 km^{2})
- Elevation: 187 ft (57 m)

Population (2020)
  - Total: 3,217
  - Density: 931.9/sq mi (359.81/km^{2})
- Time zone: UTC-5 (Eastern (EST))
  - Summer (DST): UTC-4 (EDT)
- ZIP Code: 04250
- Area code: 207
- FIPS code: 23-40000
- GNIS feature ID: 2806273

Lisbon is a census-designated place (CDP) in the town of Lisbon, Androscoggin County, Maine, United States. It is one of the two main villages in the town, the other being Lisbon Falls. Lisbon village is in the western half of the town of Lisbon and is located on the Sabattus River, a south-flowing tributary of the Androscoggin River. Maine State Route 196 passes through the village, leading southeast 3 miles (5 km) to Lisbon Falls and northwest 7 miles (11 km) to Lewiston. The small village of Lisbon Center is in the southeast part of the CDP.

Lisbon was first listed as a CDP prior to the 2020 census.

== Demographics ==
Historical population
| Census | Pop. | Note | %± |
|---|---|---|---|
| 2020 | 3,217 | | — |
U.S. Decennial Census
