= 1940 Maine gubernatorial election =

- September 9, 1940
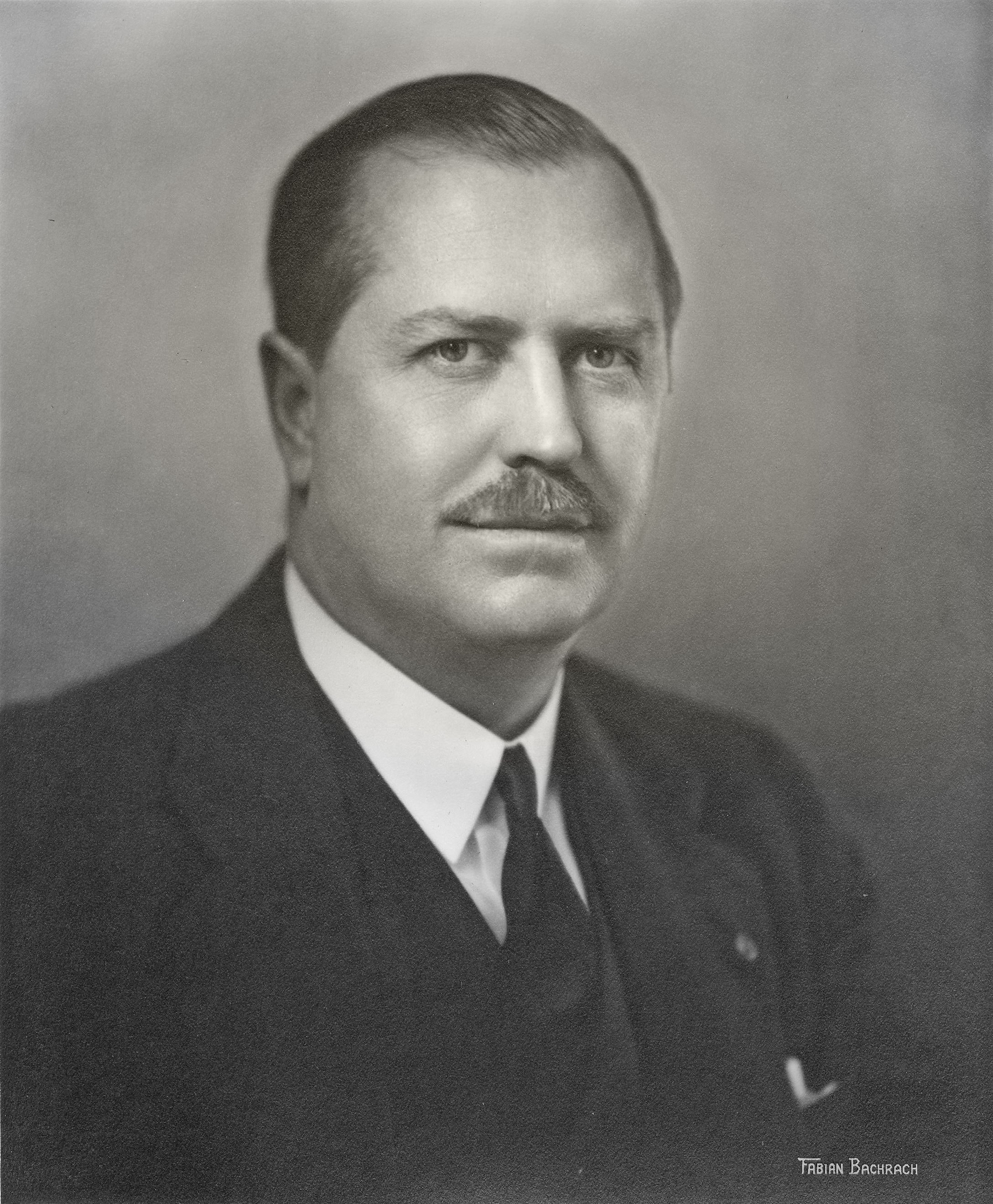

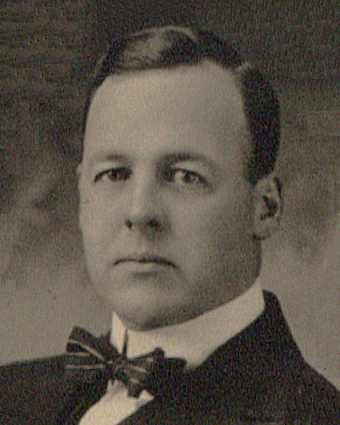
| Nominee | Sumner Sewall | Fulton J. Redman |
| Party | Republican | Democratic |
| Popular vote | 162,719 | 92,053 |
| Percentage | 63.87% | 36.13% |
- County results Sewall: 50–60% 60–70% 70–80%
Governor before election
Lewis O. Barrows
Republican
Elected Governor
Sumner Sewall
Republican

The 1940 Maine gubernatorial election took place on September 9, 1940. Incumbent Republican Governor Lewis O. Barrows was term limited and unable to seek re-election. Republican Maine Senate President Sumner Sewall faced off against Democrat Fulton J. Redman in the general election, beating him easily. This election was the last gubernatorial contest in Maine held prior to United States involvement in the second world war. Frederick G. Payne unsuccessfully ran for the Republican nomination.

== Results ==
1940 gubernatorial election, Maine
| Party | Candidate | Votes | % | ±% |
|---|---|---|---|---|
| Republican | Sumner Sewall | 162,719 | 63.87% | − |
| Democratic | Fulton J. Redman | 92,053 | 36.13% | − |
| Majority | | 70,666 | 27.74% | |
