= 1942 Maine gubernatorial election =

- September 14, 1942
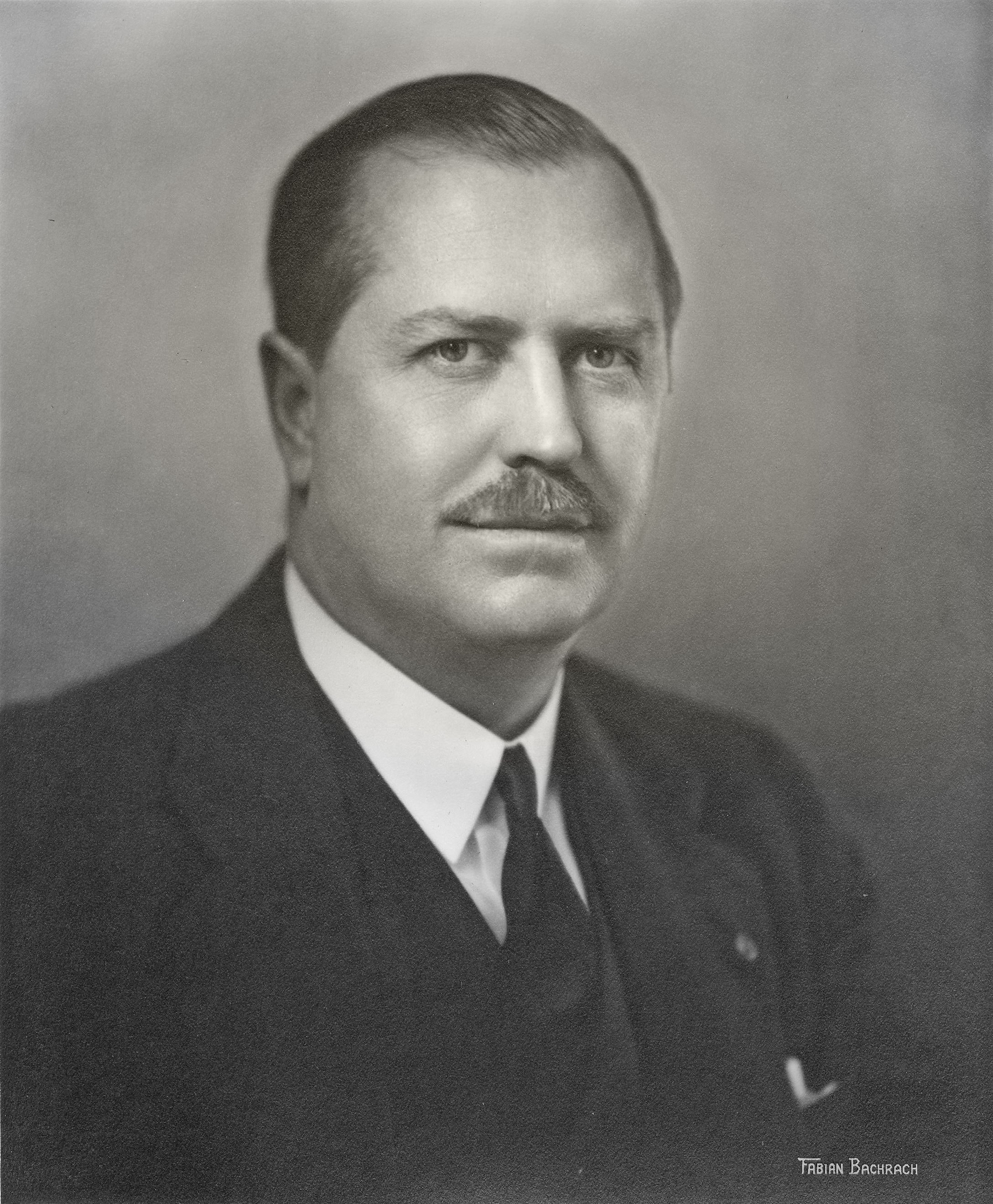

Nominee	Sumner Sewall	George W. Lane, Jr.
Party	Republican	Democratic
Popular vote	118,047	58,558
Percentage	66.84%	33.16%
- County results Sewall: 50–60% 60–70% 70–80%
Governor before election
Sumner Sewall
Republican
Elected Governor
Sumner Sewall
Republican

The 1942 Maine gubernatorial election took place on September 14, 1942. Incumbent Republican Governor Sumner Sewall was seeking a second term, and faced off against Democratic challenger George W. Lane, Jr. Sewall was able to easily win his re-election. This contest was the first gubernatorial election held after the entry of the United States into the second world war.

== Results ==
1942 Gubernatorial Election, Maine
Party	Candidate	Votes	%	±%
Republican	Sumner Sewall (incumbent)	118,047	66.84%	−
Democratic	George W. Lane, Jr.	58,558	33.16%	−
Majority		59,489	33.68%	
