= 1942 United States Senate election in Maine =

- September 14, 1942
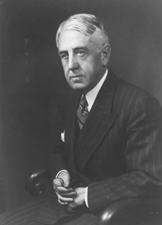

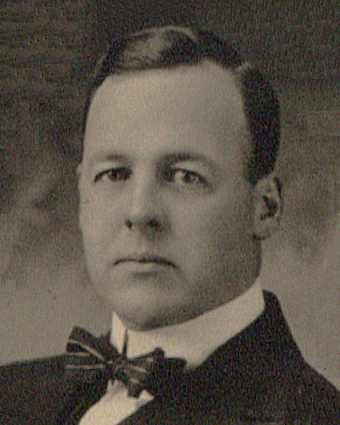
Nominee	Wallace White	Fulton J. Redman
Party	Republican	Democratic
Popular vote	111,520	55,754
Percentage	66.67%	33.33%
- County results White: 50–60% 60–70% 70–80%
U.S. senator before election
Wallace H. White Jr.
Republican
Elected U.S. Senator
Wallace H. White Jr.
Republican

The 1942 United States Senate election in Maine was held on September 14, 1942. Incumbent Republican U.S. Senator Wallace White was re-elected to a third term over Fulton J. Redman.

== Republican primary ==
=== Candidates ===
- Wallace H. White Jr., incumbent Senator since 1931

=== Results ===
Senator White was unopposed for re-nomination.

1942 Republican U.S. Senate primary
Party	Candidate	Votes	%
Republican	Wallace H. White Jr. (inc.)	44,142	100.00%
Total votes		44,142	100.00%

== Democratic primary ==
=== Candidates ===
- Fulton J. Redman, newspaper editor and perennial candidate from Bar Harbor

=== Results ===
Redman was unopposed for the Democratic nomination.

1942 Democratic U.S. Senate primary
Party	Candidate	Votes	%
Democratic	Fulton J. Redman	8,632	100.00%
Total votes		8,632	100.00%

== General election ==
=== Results ===
1942 U.S. Senate election in Maine
Party	Candidate	Votes	%	±%
Republican	Wallace H. White Jr. (inc.)	111,520	66.67%	▲15.92
Democratic	Fulton J. Redman	55,754	33.33%	▼15.92
Total votes		167,274	100.00%	

== See also ==
- 1942 United States Senate elections
