= Lisbon, Maine =

Town in Maine, United States

- Town
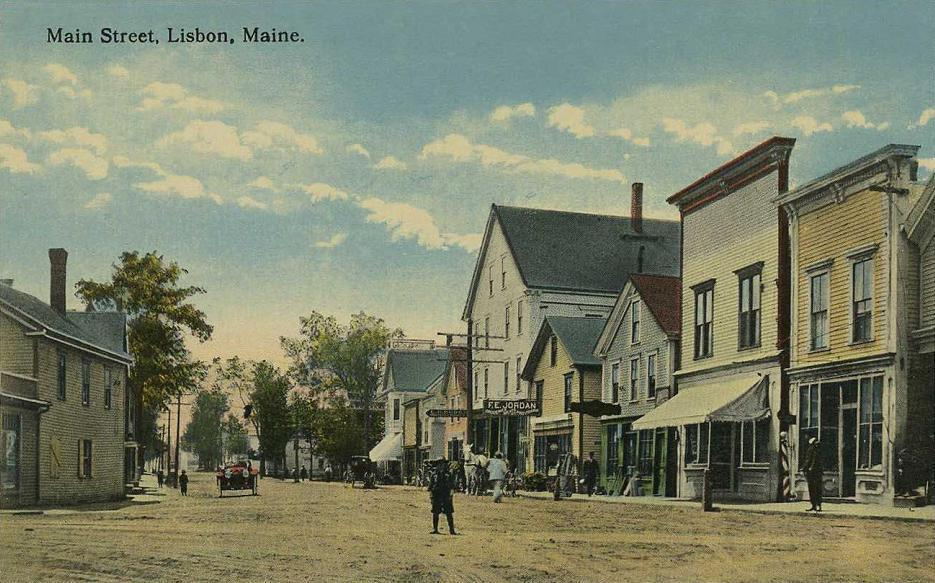
- Main Street c. 1914

- Seal

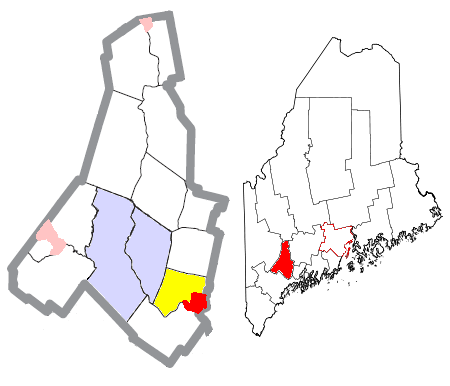
- Location of the town of Lisbon (in yellow) in Androscoggin County and the state of Maine
- Coordinates: 44°00′51″N 70°06′37″W
- Country: United States
- State: Maine
- County: Androscoggin
- Incorporated: June 22, 1799
- Villages: Lisbon; Lisbon Center; Lisbon Falls

Area
  - Total: 23.82 sq mi (61.69 km^{2})
  - Land: 22.82 sq mi (59.10 km^{2})
  - Water: 1.00 sq mi (2.59 km^{2})
- Elevation: 177 ft (54 m)

Population (2020)
  - Total: 9,711
  - Density: 426/sq mi (164.3/km^{2})
- Time zone: UTC−5 (Eastern (EST))
  - Summer (DST): UTC−4 (EDT)
- ZIP Codes: 04250 (Lisbon); 04252 (Lisbon Falls)
- Area code: 207
- FIPS code: 23-40035
- GNIS feature ID: 582563
- Website: www.lisbonmaine.gov

Lisbon is a town in Androscoggin County, Maine, United States. The population was 9,711 at the 2020 census. It is included in both the Lewiston-Auburn, Maine Metropolitan Statistical Area and the Lewiston–Auburn, Maine Metropolitan New England City and Town Area. The town of Lisbon includes the villages of Lisbon and Lisbon Falls.

== History ==
The community was originally part of Bowdoin, a township within the Kennebec Purchase. But because travel to attend town meetings was difficult, on June 22, 1799, the General Court of Massachusetts divided Bowdoin in two to create Thompsonborough. Residents, however, soon grew dissatisfied with the long name. Consequently, it would be renamed in 1802 as Lisbon, after Lisbon in Portugal. In 1808, Lisbon annexed the remainder of Little River Plantation (part of the Pejepscot Purchase) as Lisbon Falls. In 1840, part of Lisbon was set off as Webster.

With fertile and easily cultivated soil, farming was an early industry. Sawmills and gristmills were built using water power from the streams. Larger brick mills followed to manufacture textiles. In 1864, the Worumbo Mill was established to produce woolens, and would remain a principal employer until it burned in 1987.

=== Spree shooting ===
On October 25, 2023, a spree shooting occurred at two locations in Lewiston, Maine. Eighteen people were killed, and 13 others were injured. The first mass shooting occurred at a bowling alley during a youth league event, while the second occurred minutes later at a restaurant. After a two-day manhunt and shelter in place, the shooter, 40-year-old Robert R. Card, was found dead on October 27 from an apparent self-inflicted gunshot wound at a recycling facility in Lisbon after his vehicle was located nearby the night on the shooting. It was the deadliest mass shooting in the history of Maine.

== Geography ==
According to the United States Census Bureau, the town has a total area of 23.82 square miles (61.69 km^{2}), of which 22.82 square miles (59.10 km^{2}) is land and 1.00 square mile (2.59 km^{2}) is water. Lisbon is drained by the Sabattus River, Little River and Androscoggin River.

== Demographics ==
Historical population
Census	Pop.	Note	%±
1810	1,614		—
1820	2,240		38.8%
1830	2,423		8.2%
1840	1,532		−36.8%
1850	1,495		−2.4%
1860	1,376		−8.0%
1870	2,014		46.4%
1880	2,641		31.1%
1890	3,120		18.1%
1900	3,603		15.5%
1910	4,116		14.2%
1920	4,091		−0.6%
1930	4,002		−2.2%
1940	4,123		3.0%
1950	4,318		4.7%
1960	5,042		16.8%
1970	6,544		29.8%
1980	8,769		34.0%
1990	9,457		7.8%
2000	9,077		−4.0%
2010	9,009		−0.7%
2020	9,711		7.8%
U.S. Decennial Census

=== 2010 census ===
As of the census of 2010, there were 9,009 people, 3,696 households, and 2,477 families living in the town. The population density was 394.8 inhabitants per square mile (152.4/km^{2}). There were 3,948 housing units at an average density of 173.0 per square mile (66.8/km^{2}). The racial makeup of the town was 96.2% White; 0.6% African American; 0.5% Native American; 0.5% Asian; 0.3% from other races; and 1.9% from two or more races. Hispanic or Latino of any race were 1.0% of the population.

There were 3,696 households, of which 32.4% had children under the age of 18 living with them; 49.4% were married couples living together; 11.7% had a female householder with no husband present; 5.9% had a male householder with no wife present, and 33.0% were non-families. 26.0% of all households were made up of individuals; and 8.8% had someone living alone who was 65 years of age or older. The average household size was 2.43 and the average family size was 2.90.

The median age in the town was 39.4 years. 23.5% of residents were under the age of 18; 8.3% were between the ages of 18 and 24; 26.7% were from 25 to 44; 28.8% were from 45 to 64; and 12.8% were 65 years of age or older. The gender makeup of the town was 49.0% male and 51.0% female.

=== 2000 census ===
As of the census of 2000, there were 9,077 people, 3,608 households, and 2,485 families living in the town. The population density was 384.5 inhabitants per square mile (148.5/km^{2}). There were 3,789 housing units at an average density of 160.5 per square mile (62.0/km^{2}). The racial makeup of the town was 97.41% White; 0.65% African American; 0.22% Native American; 0.39% Asian, 0.10% Pacific Islander, 0.31% from other races; and 0.93% from two or more races. Hispanic or Latino of any race were 0.74% of the population.

There were 3,608 households, out of which 34.1% had children under the age of 18 living with them, 53.3% were married couples living together, 11.2% had a female householder with no husband present, and 31.1% were non-families. 24.4% of all households were made up of individuals, and 9.1% had someone living alone who was 65 years of age or older. The average household size was 2.51 and the average family size was 2.97.

In the town, the population was spread out, with 26.5% under the age of 18; 8.3% from 18 to 24; 31.7% from 25 to 44; 21.9% from 45 to 64; and 11.6% who were 65 years of age or older. The median age was 36 years. For every 100 females, there were 96.2 males. For every 100 females age 18 and over, there were 93.2 males.

The median income for a household in the town was $38,115, and the median income for a family was $42,614. Males had a median income of $32,107 versus $21,099 for females. The per capita income for the town was $17,263. About 6.7% of families and 8.4% of the population were below the poverty line, including 10.6% of those under age 18 and 8.3% of those age 65 or over.

Voter registration

Voter Registration and Party Enrollment as of June 2022
Party	Total Voters	Percentage
Unenrolled	2560	36.3%
Democratic	1915	27.2%
Republican	2309	32.8%
Green Independent	256	3.6%
Libertarian	5	0.1%
Total	7047	100%

== Education ==
The Lisbon School Department includes three schools: Lisbon Community School, Philip W. Sugg Middle School, and Lisbon High School.

Rick Green is the Superintendent of Schools.

== Notable people ==
- Dale J. Crafts, state legislator
- William Dunn, sailor
- Benjamin Franklin Dunning, builder
- Howard Gerrish, author and teacher
- John Gould, columnist
- Louis A. Jack, state legislator and President of the Maine Board of Trade
- Stephen King, writer
- Hannah Hanson Kinney, alleged murderer
- Garrett Mason, state legislator
- Gina Mason, state legislator
- Greg Moore, hockey forward
- James Tierney, politician
