= Brian Goodhart =

Australian rules footballer, born 1913

Personal information
- Full name: Brian Goodhart
- Born: 5 April 1913
- Died: 28 August 2003 (aged 90)
- Original team: North Broken Hill

Playing career^{1}
Years	Club	Games (Goals)
1934–35	Fitzroy	15 (4)
- ^{1} Playing statistics correct to the end of 1935.

Brian Goodhart (5 April 1913 – 28 August 2003) was an Australian rules footballer who played with Fitzroy in the Victorian Football League (VFL).
