= Lisbon High School (Maine) =

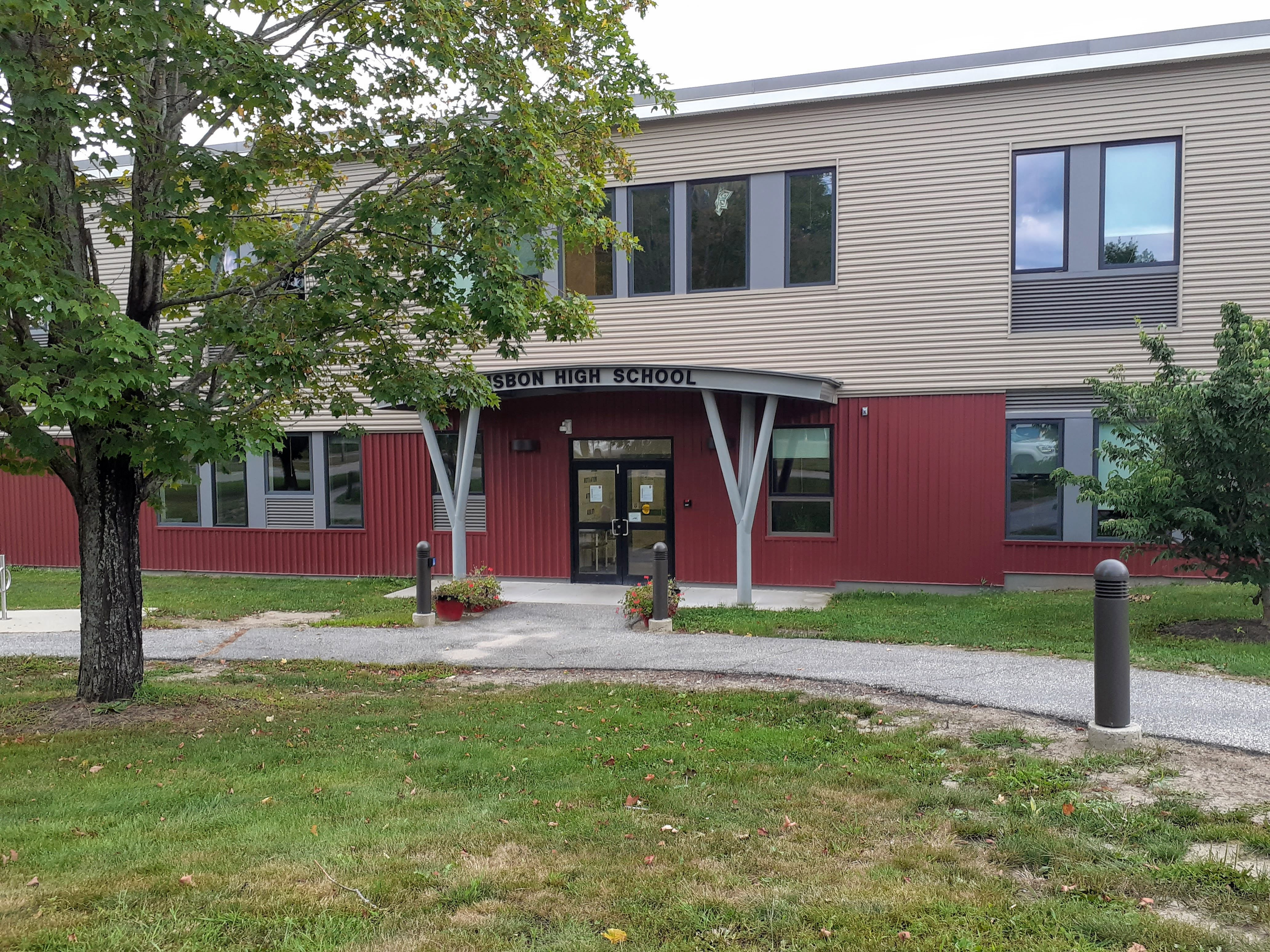

Location
- 2 Sugg Drive; Lisbon Falls, Maine 04252; United States
- Coordinates: 44°00′10″N 70°04′15″W

Information
- Superintendent: Richard Green
- Principal: Susan Magee
- Teaching staff: 25.00 (FTE)
- Grades: 9-12
- Enrollment: 396 (2024-2025)
- Student to teacher ratio: 15.84
- Colors: Black, white, and red
- Slogan: Greyhound Pride is Inside
- Athletics conference: Mountain Valley
- Mascot: Greyhound
- Rival: Oak Hill High School
- Yearbook: Lisbonian
- Website: lisbonhs.ss16.sharpschool.com/home

Lisbon High School is a public high school in Lisbon, Androscoggin County, Maine, United States. The school is overseen by the administrative district called the Lisbon School Department. Its mascot is the greyhound. Founded in 1952, its predecessor was Lisbon Falls High School.

== Sports ==
Lisbon has football, soccer, field hockey, cross country, basketball, wrestling, cheerleading, baseball, softball, tennis, and track teams. The school joins with Mt. Ararat High School for their ice hockey team.

The class C school has a track team, which has won MVCs (Mountain Valley Conference) every year since 2005 (as of 2017) and won its first state title in 2014

Lisbon's field hockey team won MVCs in 2011, and won the State Championship in 2013.

== Arts ==
Lisbon High School has an arts program as well as an extracurricular drama program. The drama program is notable for its ranking in One Act Play competitions, where they have placed regionally. They also have performed one play, White Snake, that was awarded 296 points out of a total 300, as well as members of the cast being awarded for choreography, costume design, narration and more. Currently the drama program is still running.

The performing arts center is dedicated to a deceased Vietnam veteran.

== Notable alumni ==
- Stephen King grew up in neighboring Durham and attended Lisbon High School. The school's library is dedicated to King and his wife, and holds works by both authors in its collection.
- Beverly Prosser Gelwick (class of 1950), psychologist, director of counseling at Stephens College, the University of New Hampshire, and Bowdoin College

== Cultural references ==
The school appears in the Stephen King novel 11/22/63 as the school at which the main character, Jake Epping, is a teacher.
