= Wallace H. White =

American politician (1877–1952)

Wallace White
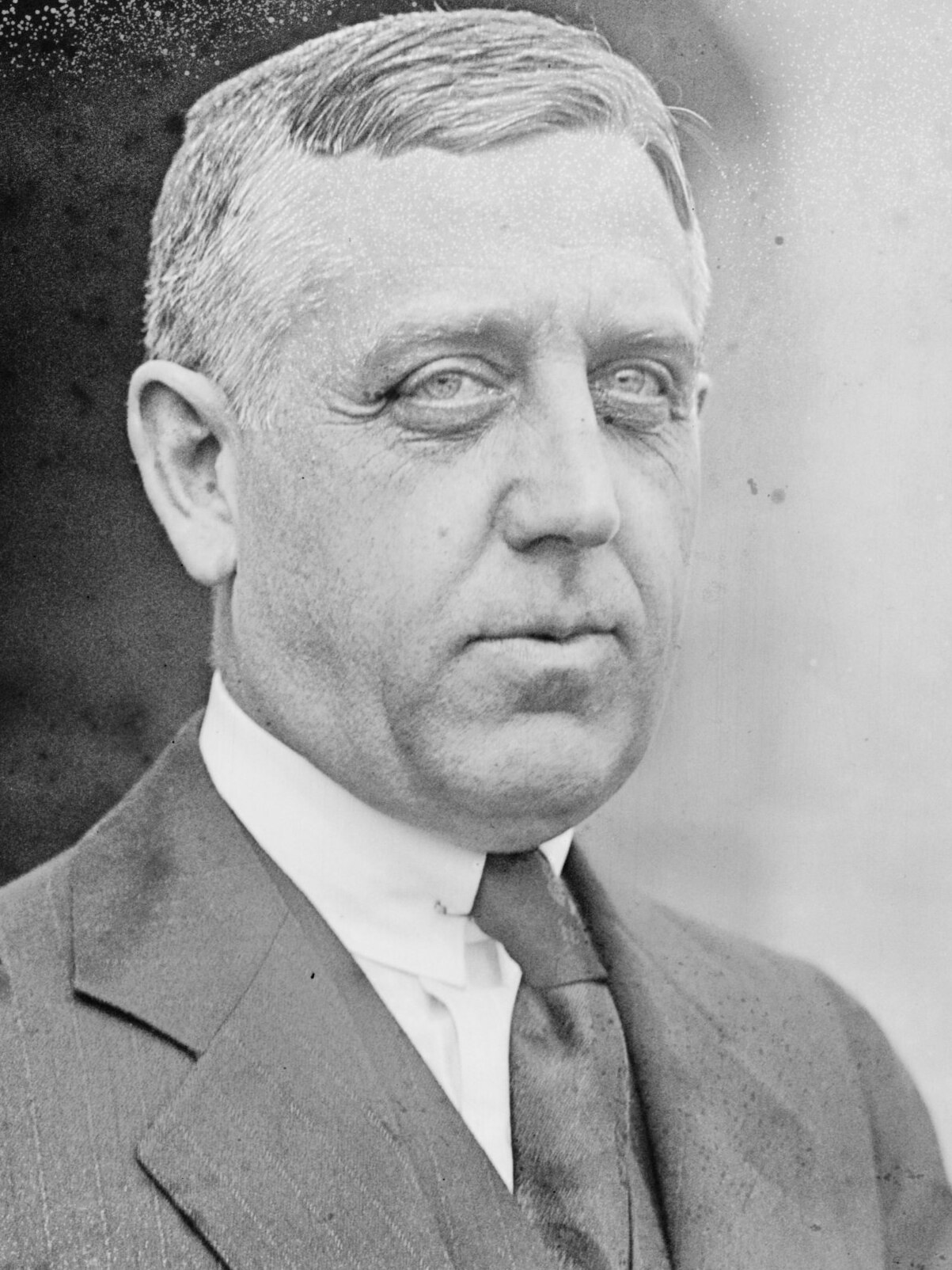
- White c. 1924

United States Senator from Maine
- In office March 4, 1931 – January 3, 1949
- Preceded by: Arthur R. Gould
- Succeeded by: Margaret Chase Smith
Senate positions
Senate Majority Leader
In office January 3, 1947 – January 3, 1949
Deputy	Kenneth S. Wherry
Preceded by	Alben W. Barkley
Succeeded by	Scott W. Lucas
Leader of the Senate Republican Conference
In office February 25, 1944 – January 3, 1949
Deputy	Kenneth S. Wherry
Preceded by	Charles L. McNary
Succeeded by	Kenneth S. Wherry
Chair of the Senate Interstate and Foreign Commerce Committee
In office January 3, 1947 – January 3, 1949
Preceded by	Burton K. Wheeler
Succeeded by	Edwin C. Johnson
Senate Minority Leader
In office February 25, 1944 (Note: Acting: February 25, 1944 – January 3, 1945) – January 3, 1947
Deputy	Kenneth S. Wherry
Preceded by	Charles L. McNary
Succeeded by	Alben W. Barkley
Secretary of the Senate Republican Conference
In office January 3, 1941 – February 25, 1944
Leader	Charles L. McNary
Preceded by	Frederick Hale
Succeeded by	Harold Hitz Burton

Member of the U.S. House of Representatives from Maine's 2nd district
- In office March 4, 1917 – March 3, 1931
- Preceded by: Daniel J. McGillicuddy
- Succeeded by: Donald B. Partridge

Personal details
- Born: Wallace Humphrey White Jr. August 6, 1877 Lewiston, Maine, U.S.
- Died: March 31, 1952 (aged 74) Auburn, Maine, U.S.
- Resting place: Mt. Auburn Cemetery
- Party: Republican
- Spouses: Anna Pratt (m. 1903; died 1914) Nina Lumbard (m. 1917)
- Relations: William P. Frye (grandfather)
- Children: 2
- Education: Bowdoin College (BA)

Wallace Humphrey White Jr. (August 6, 1877 – March 31, 1952) was an American politician and Republican leader in the United States Congress from 1917 until 1949. White was from the U.S. state of Maine and served in the U.S. House of Representatives before being elected to the U.S. Senate, where he was Senate Minority Leader and later Majority Leader before his retirement.

== Early life ==
White was born in Lewiston, Maine. His grandfather, William P. Frye, was also a prominent political figure, having served as a Senator from Maine and President pro tempore. In 1899, White graduated from Bowdoin College in Brunswick. After graduating, he became the assistant clerk to the Senate Committee on Commerce and later secretary to his grandfather. White studied law and was admitted to the bar, afterward beginning to practice in Lewiston.

== Career ==
The political career of White began when he was elected as a Republican to the U.S. House of Representatives in 1916. He took office on March 4 of the following year and served until March 3, 1931 (65th–71st Congresses). He left the House in 1931 after being elected to the Senate in late 1930.

In Congress, White served as chairman of the House Committee on Expenditures in the Department of Justice (66th Congress), the House Committee on Woman Suffrage (67th through 69th Congresses), the House Committee on Merchant Marine and Fisheries (70th and 71st Congresses), and the Senate Committee on Interstate and Foreign Commerce (80th Congress). He also served as a presidential appointee on a variety of commissions.

White was reelected in 1936 and 1942 and served from March 4, 1931, to January 3, 1949. He was elected minority leader by his colleagues (1944–1947), and became majority leader when his party held a majority in the 80th Congress (1947–1949). According to John Gunther's 1947 book Inside U.S.A., as the titular party floor leader, "his chief function is to hold the balance between two much more dominant and vivid men, Taft and Vandenberg...Everybody likes White; few people pay much attention to him."

White was one of a handful of senators who voted against the elevation of Hugo Black to the Supreme Court in 1937 based on his previous Klan membership.

He was not a candidate for renomination in 1948. In 1952, White died in Auburn and is interred at the Mt. Auburn Cemetery.

== Family ==
White was married twice, first to Anna Pratt of Lewiston in 1903. One son, Herbert Frye White, was born in 1904. In 1914, Anna Pratt White and an infant daughter Helen Hayden White both died in childbirth. In 1917 White married widow Nina Lumbard Lunn. Nina Lunn was the widow of Ralph Lunn and she brought to the marriage a son, Richard Lunn and daughter, Nina Katherine Lunn.

== Notes ==
U.S. House of Representatives
Preceded by Daniel J. McGillicuddy	Member of the U.S. House of Representatives from Maine's 2nd congressional district 1917–1931	Succeeded by Donald B. Partridge
Preceded by Warren Worth Bailey	Chair of the House Justice Department Expenditures Committee; 1919–1921	Succeeded by Stuart F. Reed
Preceded by James Mann	Chair of the House Woman Suffrage Committee; 1921–1927	Position abolished
Preceded by Frank D. Scott	Chair of the House Merchant Marine Committee; 1927–1931	Succeeded by Ewin L. Davis
Party political offices
Preceded by Arthur R. Gould	Republican nominee for U.S. Senator from Maine (Class 2); 1930, 1936, 1942	Succeeded by Margaret Smith
Preceded by Frederick Hale	Secretary of the Senate Republican Conference; 1941–1944	Succeeded by Harold Hitz Burton
Preceded by Charles L. McNary	Senate Republican Leader; 1944–1949; Acting: 1944–1945	Succeeded by Kenneth S. Wherry
U.S. Senate
Preceded by Arthur R. Gould	U.S. Senator (Class 2) from Maine; 1931–1949; Served alongside: Frederick Hale, Owen Brewster	Succeeded by Margaret Smith
Preceded by Charles L. McNary	Senate Minority Leader; 1944–1947; Acting: 1944–1945	Succeeded by Alben W. Barkley
Preceded by Burton K. Wheeler	Chair of the Senate Interstate and Foreign Commerce Committee; 1947–1949	Succeeded by Edwin C. Johnson
Preceded by Alben W. Barkley	Senate Majority Leader; 1947–1949	Succeeded by Scott W. Lucas
