= Louis A. Jack =

American politician

- Born: Louis A. Jack; July 12, 1877; Topsham, Maine, US
- Died: January 31, 1964 (aged 86); Lisbon, Maine
- Occupation: State Legislator (1929-1932)

Louis Albion Jack (July 12, 1877 - January 31, 1964) was an American politician from Maine.

Jack was born to Anglo-American parents in Topsham, Maine. His father, Albion S. Jack (1844–1917), was a successful businessman in the sale of lumber as well as in farming. At the age of 16 he left Topsham schools and moved to Lisbon, where he resided for the remainder of his life. After initially studying business at Shaw's Business College in Portland, Jack instead chose law and was admitted to the Maine State Bar in 1900. After briefly forming a partnership with H.E. Coolidge, Jack began an independent practice in 1904. As of 1919, Jack had twice served as President of the Maine State Board of Trade. In 1920, Jack, who was a staunch Republican, sought the Republican nomination for Maine Governor but lost to Owen Brewster. From 1929 to 1932, he served in the Maine House of Representatives as a representative from Lisbon, Maine. He also served as Judge of the Lisbon Falls Municipal Court from 1940 to 1946.

Jack died in 1964 and is buried at Hillside Cemetery in Lisbon Falls, Maine.
