= Arthur R. Gould =

American politician

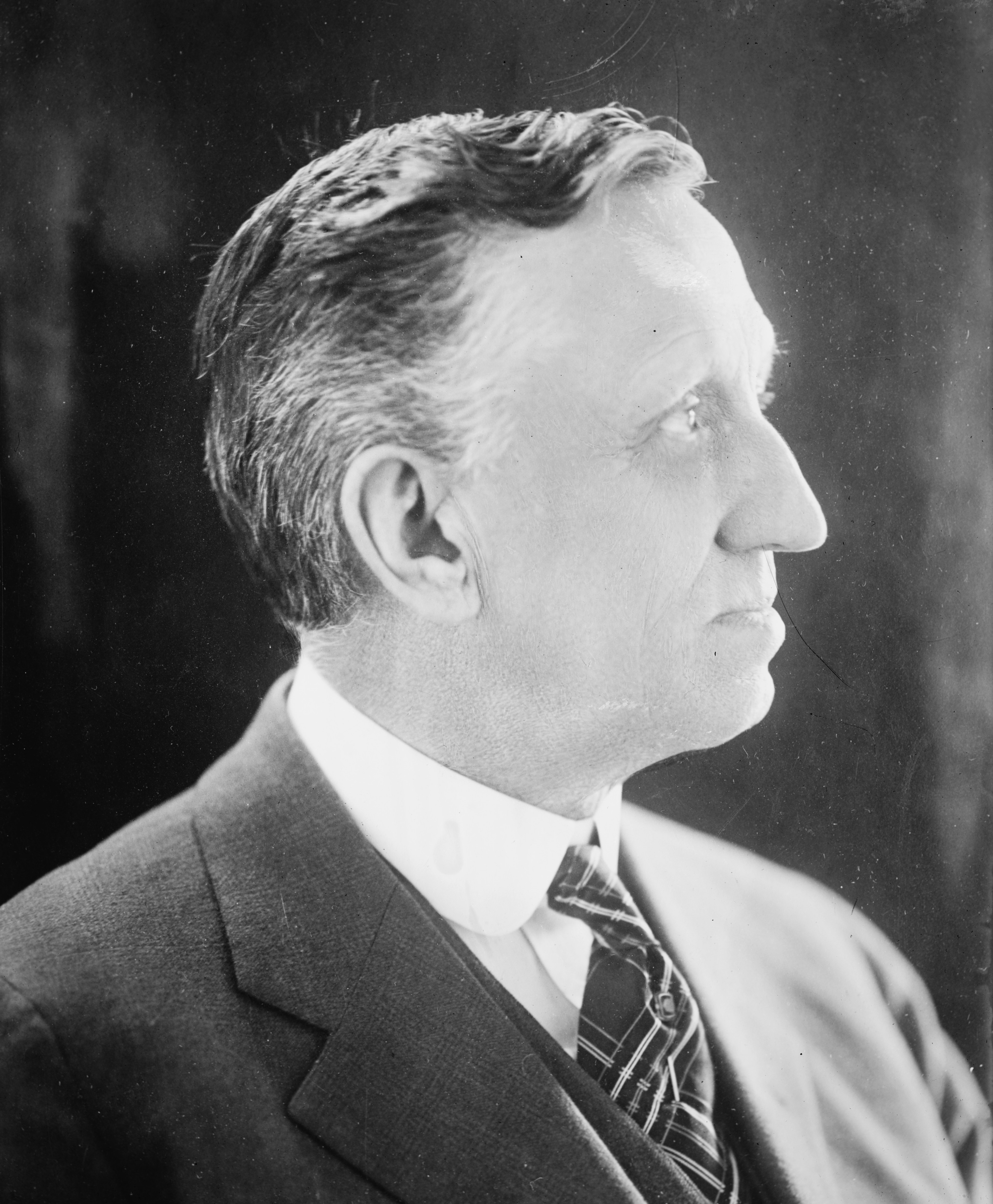

United States Senator from Maine
- In office November 30, 1926 – March 3, 1931
- Preceded by: Bert M. Fernald
- Succeeded by: Wallace H. White Jr.

Member of the Maine Senate from the 16th district
- In office January 5, 1921 – January 3, 1923
- Preceded by: Seth S. Thornton
- Succeeded by: Allen C. T. Wilson

Personal details
- Born: Arthur Robinson Gould; March 16, 1857 Corinth, Maine, U.S.
- Died: July 24, 1946 (aged 89) Presque Isle, Maine, U.S.
- Party: Republican
- Spouse: Mary Frances Donovan
- Children: 3

Arthur Robinson Gould (March 16, 1857 – July 24, 1946) was an American industrialist involved in lumber, railroads, hydroelectricity, and other large scale industry in Aroostook County, Maine and the neighboring Canadian province of New Brunswick from the 1880s until his death in 1946. From 1926 to 1931, he served as a Republican United States senator from Maine. Prior to being elected to the Senate, he had stated that he was in favor of maintaining the Eighteenth Amendment to the United States Constitution which banned the manufacture, sale, or transportation of alcohol. However, once in office, he became nationally known for writing in favor of the legalization of wine and beer.

Born in Corinth, Maine, he attended the common schools and East Corinth Academy. He moved first to Bangor, Maine, where he opened a candy factory and met Mary Frances Donovan, who he later married. They moved to Presque Isle, Maine, in 1887, where he engaged in the lumber business, built power plants, and an electric railroad. He was president of the Aroostook Valley Railroad from 1902 to 1946.

Gould served in the Maine Senate from 1921 to 1922, and was elected on September 13, 1926, as a Republican to the U.S. Senate to fill the vacancy caused by the death of Bert M. Fernald and served from November 30, 1926, to March 3, 1931. He was not a candidate for renomination in 1930. During his time in office he served as chairman of the U.S. Senate Committee on Immigration for the 71st Congress.

He died at his home in Presque Isle in 1946. He is interred at Bangor's Mount Pleasant Cemetery alongside his wife. Northern Light A.R. Gould Hospital is named in his honor.

== Anti-Klan Republican ==
The special election to replace Senator Fernald occurred near the height of the Ku Klux Klan's influence in Maine politics. Klan infiltration of the Democratic Party split Maine Republicans, with Klansmen finding their champion in Maine Governor Owen Brewster, and their chief opponents in former Governor Percival P. Baxter and Senator Frederick Hale. Gould, whose wife was Catholic, ran on an anti-Klan platform after receiving the Republican nomination for Senator, which caused Gov. Brewster to take the unprecedented step of denouncing his own party's candidate in the general election.

The Maine special election was of national importance because the U.S. Senate was evenly split along party lines (47 to 47). Maine Democrats, however, deserted their party in droves to vote for Gould, in order to break the power of the Republican Klan faction. In an unprecedented outcome, Gould carried every city and county in the state. The Chairman of the Republican State Committee hailed Gould's victory as demonstrating that "the sinister influence of an oath-bound organization no longer threatens the welfare of Maine". The issue would be played out one more time, however, when Gov. Brewster challenged Sen. Hale for the Republican Senate nomination in 1928, and lost, signaling the eclipse of Grand Dragon DeForest H. Perkins and the Klan as a force in Maine politics.

Gould was no friend of the Klan, but he shared with them antipathy toward immigrants, especially French-Canadians. While in the Senate, he joined the Senate Committee on Immigration and proposed a bill that would have set a quota on immigration from Canada, thus reducing Maine's French Canadian population. However, the measure was defeated.

== Anti-Prohibition Republican ==
Although the US was experiencing Prohibition in the 1920s, and Maine had the nation's oldest prohibition law, and the Republican Party was the main proponent of prohibition, Gould did not believe in it and both made and consumed alcohol at home. He created a minor scandal in 1929 when a testimonial he had written in 1927, revealing that he fermented fruit juice for personal consumption, was made public. Gould had written that "I come from a prohibition state and am supposed to be a prohibitionist, but I am about as loyal to the prohibition element as some Southern Democrats are to the Democratic Party". Maine's temperance proponents declared they'd work to unseat Gould, but he stated soon after that he wouldn't run for a second term, while denying the prohibitionist threat entered into his decision. In making that announcement Gould referred to prohibition as "this rotten farce".

== New Brunswick bribery scandal ==
During the 1926 election, Gould's opponent accused him of having bribed the Premier of the Canadian province of New Brunswick in 1918 in order to secure concessions for the Saint John Valley and Quebec Railway, of which Gould was the major investor. Gould did not deny that a bribe of $100,000 was paid, but he claimed this was done by his associates without his knowledge, and that an additional $50,000 asked for by the Premier was refused, leading to the collapse of the railway. Gould claimed that bribery was standard practice in New Brunswick for American companies, and he was more a victim than perpetrator in this instance. The bribery charges led to a resolution by Democratic Senator Thomas J. Walsh of Montana that would have prevented Gould from being seated in the Senate, but this was defeated and Gould was sworn in. A Senate sub-committee was formed to investigate the charge, however, and Gould was exonerated.

== Speaking style ==
Gould was noted for speaking his mind plainly and frankly. In a 1929 newspaper interview, he described Sen. George W. Norris of Nebraska as a "bitter, sour old man with not a good word for anybody" and said Sen. Thomas J. Walsh of Montana "hasn't got a kindly thought in his system". Both men were well-known progressives, and such statements perhaps reveal Gould's instinctive conservatism as much as their clashing temperaments. Gould was particularly suspicious of the Midwest and West for wanting to wrest too much power from the Eastern states, and from New England in particular. However, he also derided his own political skills, saying "the fact of the matter is that I'm not cut out for politics, I want to get back to my railroad and the pine forests of Maine." His favorite politician was Calvin Coolidge and one of his best friends in the Senate was a Democrat, Senator Joseph E. Ransdell of Louisiana.

== The Arthur R. Gould Memorial Hospital ==
Arthur R. Gould was a resident of Presque Isle for nearly 60 years. In 1955 the city hospital had outgrown its facilities and new construction was planned on a 30-acre (12 ha) farm on the "outskirts" of town. Fundraising began the following year, and was accelerated with the Ford Foundation grant of $27,500. Gould's only surviving child, Marie Gould Wildes and her husband W. H. Wildes, surprised the committee with a donation of $100,000. The hospital was promptly named the Arthur R. Gould Memorial Hospital.

Maine Senate
Preceded by Seth S. Thornton	Member of the Maine Senate from the 16th district 1921–1923; Served alongside: Delmont Emerson, Leander E. Tuttle	Succeeded by
Party political offices
Preceded by Bert M. Fernald	Republican nominee for U.S. Senator from Maine (Class 2); 1926	Succeeded by Wallace H. White Jr.
U.S. Senate
Preceded by Bert M. Fernald	U.S. senator (Class 2) from Maine; 1926–1931; Served alongside: Frederick Hale	Succeeded by Wallace H. White, Jr.
