= Goodheart–Willcox =

- Founded: 1921
- Founder: William Goodheart and Charles D. Willcox
- Country of origin: United States
- Headquarters location: Tinley Park, Illinois
- Publication types: Books
- Official website: www.g-w.com

Goodheart–Willcox is a book publishing company based in Tinley Park, Illinois, United States. It was founded in 1921, and its current CEO is Shannon DeProfio.
