= Guan Qiao =

Chinese engineer (1935–2022)

Member of the National People's Congress (6th)
- In office October 1983 – October 1988
- Constituency: Shanxi

Personal details
- Born: 2 July 1935 Taiyuan, Shanxi, China
- Died: 26 December 2022 (aged 87) Beijing, China
- Party: Chinese Communist Party
- Education: Bauman Moscow State Technical University

Chinese name
- Traditional Chinese: 關橋
- Simplified Chinese: 关桥
Transcriptions
Standard Mandarin
- Hanyu Pinyin: Guān Qiáo
- Scientific career
- Fields: Welding
- Workplaces: Beijing Aeronautical Manufacturing Technology Research Institute (BAMTRI)

Guan Qiao (Chinese: 关桥; 2 July 1935 – 26 December 2022) was a Chinese engineer specializing in welding. He was an academician of the Chinese Academy of Engineering and formerly served as president of the China Welding Association and vice-president of the International Institute of Welding.

== Name ==
His first name, "Qiao" (桥; 'Bridge'), was given by his father, who hoped that Guan Qiao would grow up to be a bridge engineer to revitalize Chinese industry.

== Biography ==
Guan was born in Taiyuan, Shanxi, on July 2, 1935, while his ancestral home is in Xiangfen County. His father was an engineer in water conservancy and railway construction. His mother was a primary school teacher. After the Marco Polo Bridge Incident broke out in 1937, Shanxi was colonised by the Imperial Japanese Army, Guan fled to Shaanxi with his mother and lived in a cave in the mountains of Yichuan County. He secondary studied at Beijing Huiwen Middle School. After studying Russian for a year in Beijing Russian Specialized School, Guan was sent to the Soviet Union to study at the Bauman Moscow State Technical University in 1953. He joined the Chinese Communist Party in 1956. He returned to China in 1959 and had a brief assignment to the Ninth Research Institute of the Second Ministry of Machinery Industry as a welder. In 1959 he went back to his alma mater and obtained a K.T.H. degree in 1963. When he returned to China, he served as a senior engineer at the Beijing Aeronautical Manufacturing Technology Research Institute (BAMTRI) (now AVIC Manufacturing Technology Institute). He was president of the China Welding Association from 1990 to 1995 and vice-president of the International Institute of Welding from 1992 to 1995.

Guan was a deputy to the 11th, 12th and 13th National Congress of the Chinese Communist Party. He was a delegate to the 6th National People's Congress and a member of the 9th and 10th National Committee of the Chinese People's Political Consultative Conference.

Guan died in Beijing on 26 December 2022, at the age of 87.

== Selected papers ==
- Q. Guan; R. H. Leggatt; K. W. Brown (1988). "LSND Welding of ThinWalled Structural Elements". The Welding Institute. Cambridge, United Kingdom.
- Q. Guan; Y. Cao (1993). "Verification of FE Program for Welding Thermal Strain-Stress Analysis Using High Temperature Moire Measurement". Welding in the World. 31. France: International Institute of Welding.
- Q. Guan; C. X. Zhang; D. L. Guo (1994). "Dynamic Control of Welding Distortion by Moving Spot Heat Sink". Welding in the World. 33. France: International Institute of Welding.
- Q. Guan (1994). "Low Stress No-Distortion Welding-A New Technique for Thin Materials". Welding in the World. 33. France: International Institute of Welding.
- Q. Guan (1999). "A Survey of Development in Welding Stress and Distortion Controlling in Aerospace Manufacturing Engineering in China". Welding in the World. 43. France: International Institute of Welding.

== Honours and awards ==
- 1994 Member of the Chinese Academy of Engineering
- 1998 Science and Technology Progress Award of the Ho Leung Ho Lee Foundation
- 1999 Lifetime Achievement Award of the International Institute of Welding
- 2005 Lifetime Achievement Award of the China Welding Association
- 2005 Brooker Medal of The Welding Institute
- 2010 Order of Merit, 3rd class (Ukraine)
- 2017 IIW Fellow Award
