= Granta (disambiguation) =

Granta is a literary magazine and publisher.

Granta may also refer to:

== Places ==
- Lada Granta, Russian car model
- River Granta, a stretch of the River Cam, England
- Granta Park, science, technology, and biomedical park near Cambridge, England
- Granta, Alberta

== Other uses ==
- A reserve boat of Cambridge University Lightweight Rowing Club
