= Welder =

Tradesperson who specializes in fusing materials together

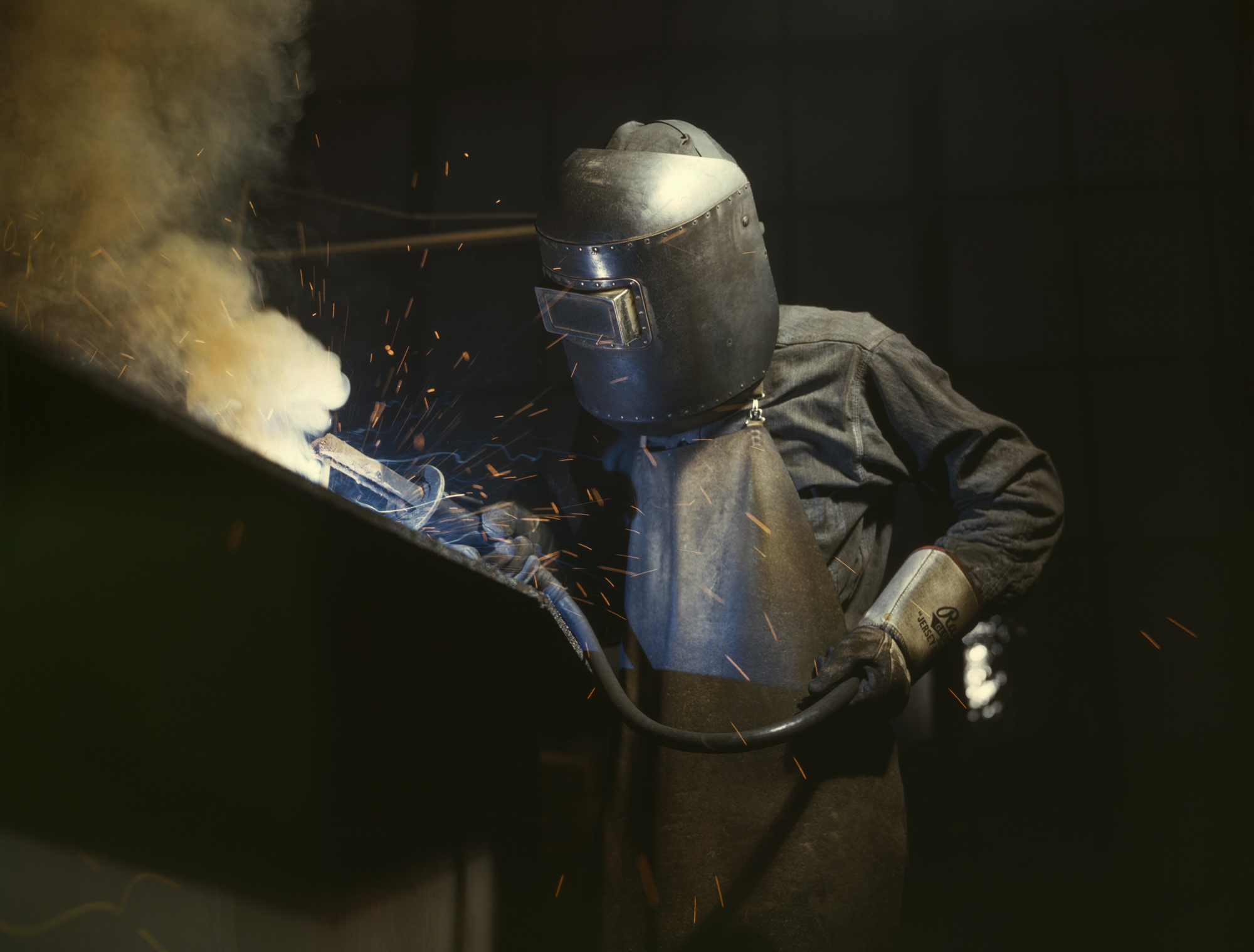
- A welder making boilers for a ship, Combustion Engineering Company, Chattanooga, Tennessee in 1942

Occupation
- Names: Welder
- Occupation type: Vocational
- Activity sectors: Construction; Industrial manufacturing Shipbuilding

Description
- Competencies: Manual dexterity Math; Reading and comprehension
- Education required: Apprenticeship
- Related jobs: Boilermaker, carpenter, electrician, plumber

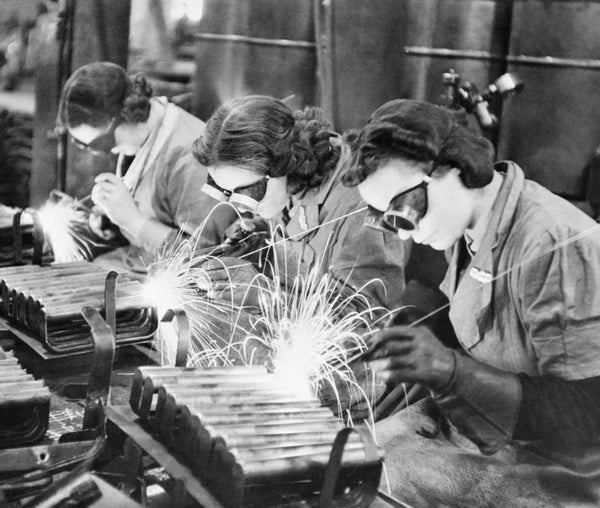
Welders at work, c. 1939.

A welder is a person or equipment that fuses materials together. The term welder refers to the operator, the machine is referred to as the welding power supply. The materials to be joined can be metals (such as steel, aluminum, brass, stainless steel etc.) or varieties of plastic or polymer. Welders typically have to have good dexterity and attention to detail, as well as technical knowledge about the materials being joined and best practices in the field.

== Safety issues ==
Welding, without the proper precautions appropriate for the process, can be a dangerous and unhealthy practice. However, with the use of new technology and proper protection, the risks of injury and death associated with welding can be greatly reduced. Because many common welding procedures involve an open electric arc or a flame, the risk of burns is significant. To prevent them, welders wear personal protective equipment in the form of heavy leather gloves and protective long sleeve jackets to avoid exposure to extreme heat and flames. Additionally, the brightness of the weld area leads to a condition called arc eye in which ultraviolet light causes the inflammation of the cornea and can burn the retinas of the eyes. Full face welding helmets with dark face plates are worn to prevent this exposure, and in recent years, new helmet models have been produced that feature a faceplate that self-darkens upon exposure to high amounts of UV light. To protect bystanders, opaque welding curtains often surround the welding area. These curtains, made of a polyvinyl chloride plastic film, shield nearby workers from exposure to the UV light from the electric arc, but should not be used to replace the filter glass used in helmets.

Welders are also often exposed to dangerous gases and particulate matter. Processes like flux-cored arc welding and shielded metal arc welding produce smoke containing particles of various types of oxides, which in some cases can lead to medical conditions like metal fume fever. The size of the particles in question tends to influence the toxicity of the fumes, with smaller particles presenting a greater danger. Additionally, many processes produce fumes and various gases, most commonly carbon dioxide and ozone, that can prove dangerous if ventilation is inadequate. Furthermore, because the use of compressed gases and flames in many welding processes pose an explosion and fire risk, some common precautions include limiting the amount of oxygen in the air and keeping combustible materials away from the workplace. Welders with expertise in welding pressurized vessels, including submarine hulls, industrial boilers, and power plant heat exchangers and boilers, are generally referred to as boilermakers.

A lot of welders relate to getting small electrical shocks from their equipment. Occasionally, welders might work in damp crowded environments and they consider it to be a "part of the job." Welders can be shocked by faulty conditions in the welding circuit, or, from the work lead clamp, a grounded power tool that is on the bench (the workpiece or the electrode). All of these types of shocks come from the welding electrode terminal. Often these shocks are minor and are misdiagnosed as being an issue with a power tool or the power supply to the welder's area. However, the more likely cause is from stray welding current which occurs when current from the welding cables leaks into the welder's work area. Often this is not a serious problem, however, under the right circumstances, this can be fatal to the welder or anyone else inside the work area. When a welder feels a shock, they should take a minute to inspect the welding cables and ensure that they are clean and dry, and, that there are no cracks or gouges out of the rubber casing around the wire. These precautions may be life-saving to the welders.

== Notable welders ==
Notable people who have worked as welders include:

- Mohammad Abbas, Pakistani cricketer
- İshak Alaton, Turkish businessman and investor
- Steve Baer, American inventor and author
- Lucian Boz, Romanian Australian writer
- Bevan Braithwaite, British engineer and businessman
- Robert Byrd, American politician
- Jessi Combs, American professional racer and television personality
- Billy Connolly, Scottish stand-up comedian and actor
- Desmond Dekker, Jamaican musician
- Tim Healy, English actor
- Marvin Heemeyer, American vehicle manufacturer and rampage bulldozer
- Werner Herzog, German film director
- Karl Hess, American author and racer
- Hardcore Holly, American professional wrestler
- Mark Honadel, American businessman, industrial manager, and politician
- Hattie Jacques, English actress
- Jesse James, American custom vehicle maker and television personality
- Igor Kurchatov, Russian Soviet physicist
- Stefan Löfven, Prime Minister of Sweden
- Ron Lyle, American boxer
- Jan Marijnissen, Dutch politician
- Nyu Kok Meng, Malaysian criminal
- William A. Schmidt, American shop foreman and politician
- Honoré Desmond Sharrer, American painter
- Paul Teutul Sr., American custom vehicle maker and television personality
- Paul Teutul Jr., American custom vehicle maker and television personality
- Gelu Voican Voiculescu, Deputy Prime Minister of Romania
- Eugene Whelan, Canadian politician

== See also ==
- Hyperbaric welding – Welding metal at elevated pressure
- Welder certification – Certification process for welders
- Welding table
- List of welding processes
- List of community colleges
