= European Federation for Welding, Joining and Cutting =

Welding organization

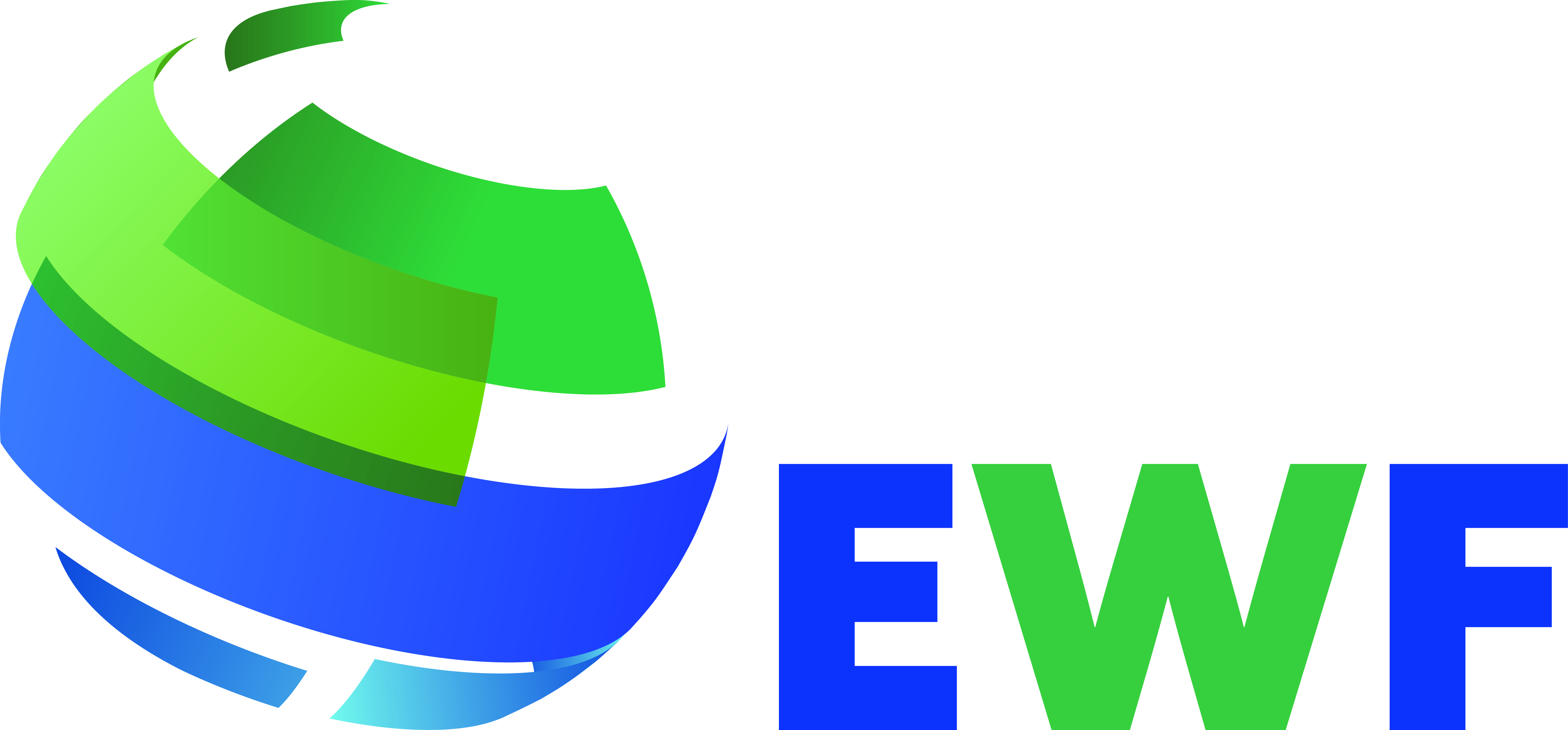
EWF - the European Federation for Welding, Joining and Cutting

The European Federation for Welding, Joining and Cutting (EWF) is an organization dedicated to education, training, qualification and certification in the field of welding and related technologies.

== History ==
In 1992, welding course providers of several EU countries wanted to harmonise their education, training, qualification and certification procedures. Thus, they set up the European Federation for Welding, Joining and Cutting (EWF). The objective was that the same qualifications could be awarded in any country by using a single syllabus for each level of the training course and a harmonized system for examinations. EWF developed a comprehensive and harmonized system for training, qualification and certification of welding personnel and managed its application ever since. It took a leading role in the innovation of learning methodologies. It is also responsible for the certification system of companies that use welding, focusing on quality, environment, health, and safety.

The challenges addressed by EWF are two-fold: Respond to the industry's professional profile requirements and provide courses that leverage current technological trends and their impact on evolving lifestyles and information acquisition patterns.

Currently (2018), EWF has members from 28 European countries and two observer members from outside Europe, represented by their national welding societies: Austria, Belgium, Bulgaria, Croatia, Czech Republic, Denmark, Finland, France, Germany, Greece, Hungary, Iran, Italy, Luxembourg, Netherlands, Norway, Poland, Portugal, Romania, Serbia, Slovakia, Slovenia, Spain, Sweden, Switzerland, Turkey, Ukraine and the United Kingdom, as well as Kazakhstan and the Russian Federation.

== EWF/IIW network ==
The federation licensed its qualification system to the International Institute of Welding (IIW) in 2000. Since then, a combined EWF/IIW qualification and certification system has been implemented worldwide. Under this harmonised system, all IIW Authorised Nominated Bodies (ANBs) also operate as EWF ANBs within their respective scopes of authorisation. As of today, the system is delivered through 27 EWF ANBs and 40 IIW ANBs, supported by more than 500 Approved Training Bodies (ATBs), and is offered in 46 countries worldwide.

EWF Authorised Nominated Bodies
Country	ANB	Website	Chief Executive
Austria	Schweisstechnische Zentralanstalt (SZA)	http://www.sza.at	Katharina Umlaub
Belgium	Association Belge du Soudage / Belgische Vereniging voor Lastechniek	http://www.bvl-abs.be	Frank Duponcheel
Bulgaria	Bulgarian Welding Society	http://bws-bg.org/en/	Stanislav Nikolov
Croatia	Hrvatsko Društvo za Tehniku Zavarivanja	http://www.hdtz-cws.com/	Slobodan Kralj
Czech Republic	Czech Welding Society ANB	http://www.cws-anb.cz	Václav Minařík
Denmark	FORCE Technology	http://www.force-cert.dk	Niels Ovesen
Finland	Suomen Hitsausteknillinen Yhdistys	http://www.shy.fi	Juha Kauppila
France	Association Française du Soudage	http://www.afs-asso.org	Philippe Lebeau
Germany	DVS PersZert	http://www.dvs-ev.de	Martin Lehmann
Greece	Welding Greek Institute	https://www.wgi.gr/	Georgia Kolyva
Hungary	Hungarian Association of Welding Technology and Material Testing	http://www.mhte.hu	László Gyura
Italy	IIS CERT srl	https://www.iis.it/	Emanuele Gandolfo
Kazakhstan	Kazakhstan Welding Association (Kazweld)	http://kazweld.kz/en	Rustambek Abdurakhmanov
Netherlands	Nederlands Instituut voor Lastechniek	http://www.nil.nl	Tim Liefaart
Norway	Norwegian Welding Association	http://www.sveis.no	Bjørnar Værnes
Poland	Łukasiewicz – Górnośląski Instytut Technologiczny – Centrum Spawalnictwa	http://www.is.lukasiewicz.gov.pl	Michał Kubica
Portugal	Instituto de Soldadura e Qualidade (ISQ)	http://www.isq.pt	Anabela Costa
Romania	ASR Cert Pers	https://asr.ro/	Horia Dascău
Serbia	DUZS-CertPers	http://www.duzs.org.rs	Vencislav Grabulov
Slovakia	Výskumný ústav zváracský	http://www.vuz.sk	Peter Durik
Slovenia	Slovensko Društvo za Varilno Tehniko	http://www.drustvo-sdvt.si	Miro Uran
Spain	Asociación Española de Soldadura y Tecnologías de Unión (CESOL)	http://www.cesol.es	Juan Vicente Rosell
Sweden	Svetskommissionen	http://www.svets.se	Elisabeth Öhman
Switzerland	Schweizerischer Verein für Schweisstechnik	https://www.svs.ch/	Daniela Grütter
Türkiye	TR-ANB by Gedik Education and Social Assistance Foundation & Turkish Welding Technologies Academy	https://tr-anb.org	Emre Tuğberk Gülnergiz
Ukraine	Paton Welding Institute Training and Qualification Centre	http://muac.kpi.ua/	Yevgenia Chvertko
United Kingdom	TWI Certification Ltd.	https://www.twicertification.com/	Emma Freckingham

The network also includes 55,000 companies worldwide.

A certification system has been developed to guarantee manufacturer compliance with EN ISO 3834 and environmental and health safety schemes and its implementation is harmonized within EWF members.

== Organization ==
The EWF has a General Assembly, a Board of Directors, a Secretariat and a Technical Committee with five working groups.

The EWF is governed by the General Assembly, which is representative of the member organizations. The General Assembly, composed of the members of the association, has full powers to accomplish the objectives of the association.

The General Assembly is responsible for electing its president and a Board of Directors.

EWF - Presidents List since 1992 until present
Name	Years	Organisation	Country
Bent Koch	1992	FORCE Technology	Denmark
Jean Quéré	1993-1995	IS - Institut de Soudure	France
J. van den Brug	1996-1998	NIL - NEDERLANDS INSTITUUT VOOR LASTECHNIEK	The Netherlands
Giulio Costa	1999-2001	IIS - ISTITUTO ITALIANO DELLA SALDATURA	Italy
Jan Pilarczyk	2002-2004	IS - Instytut Spawalnictwa	Poland
German Hernandez	2005-2007	CESOL – Asociación Española de Soldadura y Tecnologías de Unión	Spain
Tim Jessop	2008-2010	TWI - The Welding Institute	United Kingdom
Dorin Dehelean	2011-2013	ASR - Asociația Română de Sudură	Romania
Henk Bodt	2014-2016	NIL - NEDERLANDS INSTITUUT VOOR LASTECHNIEK	The Netherlands
Chris Eady	2017-2019	TWI - The Welding Institute	United Kingdom
Michal Kubica	2020-2022	IS - Instytut Spawalnictwa	Poland
Stefano Morra	2023-2025	Istituto Italiano della Saldatura IIS	Italy

EWF: Board of Directors (2025)
Name	EWF Position	Position in EWF Member Organisation	Country
Stefano Morra	President	Technical Manager at Istituto Italiano della Saldatura IIS	Italy
Imre Németh	Vice-President	Director at NIL (Nederlands Instituut voor Lastechniek)	Netherlands
Rute Ferraz	Chief Executive	EWF Chief Executive/Management Team	Portugal
Martin Lehman	Director	Head of Training and Certification in DVS e.V. and CEO of DVS ZERT GmbH	Germany
Clare McGrath	Director	CSWIP Scheme Manager & Head of Personnel Certification at TWI	United Kingdom
Fernando Mañas	Treasurer	General Director of CESOL (Asociación Española de Soldadura y Tecnologías de Unión)	Spain

The Secretariat is elected for a period of 5 years by the General Assembly from among the proposals made by the full members, in accordance with the criteria established by the General Assembly. []

EWF - Executive Management Team (2025)
Name	Position	Professional Summary
Rute Ferraz	General Manager	Manages the International System for Qualification and certification of Personnel and Companies, since 2002 and is EWF Lead Assessor. Mrs Ferraz has an international professional career of over 25 years in Quality Management in Italy, Brasil and Argentina and at present also is Director of the Training Department at ISQ – Instituto de Soldadura e Qualidade.
Eurico Assunção	Deputy Director	Deputy Director of EWF as well as an invited lecturer at Instituto Superior Técnico, University of Lisbon, in Laser Processing. Mr Eurico Assunção holds a degree as Doctor of Philosophy (PhD) Welding Engineering, from the Cranfield University and a European and International Welding Engineer Diploma. Is responsible for the Collaboration Projects of EWF and has coordinated more than 20 large projects involving organisations from all EU. Also manages the Joining Platform, as a sub-platform within the EU Platform “Manufuture”.

The EWF Technical Committee is set up by the General Assembly to cover a technical area related to training, qualification and certification in the welding and joining fields, implying a continuous activity, without any time limit, and consists of the Chairman, the representatives of the members and Working Groups.

EWF - International Joining Qualification and Certification Council (2025)
Council	Terms of Reference	Convenor
IJQCC	The EWF International Joining Qualification and Certification Council - IJQCC, is set up by the General Assembly for covering several areas of competence: Standardization, Certification, Training and Qualification in the welding, joining and cutting fields and EWF System Rules. Each area of competence consists of several working groups implying a continuous activity, without any time limit. It consists of the Chairman of the Technical Committee, a convenor per area of competence and the representatives of the members and Working Groups.	Juan Rosell
Training and Qualification	Develops, maintains and updates the EWF System for Qualification of Personnel to keep it consistent with the European rules and industry needs, assure consistency of the overall EWF system and keep liaisons with the personnel certification schemes.	Philippe Leca
Certification	Develops the strategy for the EWF System for Certification of Personnel and Companies in line with the European Standards, directives and industry needs; assures consistency of the EWF Certification Schemes with EU legislation.	Emanuele Gandolfo
Standardization	Identifies the welding standards which are worthy to the EWF members; not only related to the certification/qualification of welding and inspection personnel as well as schemes for the certification of FPC and another European standards/directives that might have a direct influence in the activities carried out by the EWF members. Assists EWF members in implementing and developing new areas of intervention related to standards/directives.	Tobias Rosado
EWF System Rules	Ensures the update of EWF rules and requirements for Personnel Qualification and Certification (PCS) according to the EWF developments; develops the EWF Operational System documents depicting the EWF organizational structure and terms of reference for each body.	Italo Fernandes
European Union Tools	EU Projects, collaboration between European Organizations, EU Rules and instruments. Assist EWF members in developing project proposals and facilitate the dissemination of upcoming European project calls.	Eurico Assunção

== Key activities ==
=== Education, training and qualification of personnel ===
The EWF qualification system has several types of professional training covering welding, bonding and related techniques. This harmonized system of education and training has been adopted by IIW as an international qualification system since 2000. Its relevance has been recognized both by ISO and CEN, which have EWF as a liaison member. These different technologies, like particular processes, require that the quality of the product be incorporated during the and maintenance, and cannot be ensured only by final testing. That entails personnel with particular high level of knowledge, skills and competencies, which can be obtained through the EWF qualification system.

There are three pillars which support the EWF Harmonized International Qualification System:

1. Technical Committee: Harmonized qualification guidelines, rules and procedures are developed and approved by all members
2. The National Member: is responsible for the supervision and implementation of the system through the Authorized Nominated Body (ANB)
3. The Approved Training Centers: Approved Training Bodies (ATBs) implement the qualification guidelines

In 2012, in its annual report about international qualifications, the European Center for the Development of Vocational Training (CEDEFOP), has considered the EWF qualification system as the best-case example, recognising the ground-breaking work done by EWF on creating a qualification framework which has been globally adopted.

==== EWF guidelines ====
The EWF training guidelines cover all professional levels in welding technology and related areas, such as thermal spraying, adhesive bonding, plastics welding and underwater welding, leading to recognised qualifications in 30 European countries and also at international level. They can be listed as follows:

Welding coordination

1. European Welding Engineer
2. European Welding Technologist
3. European Welding Specialist
4. European Welding Practitioner
5. European Diploma in Welding Coordination Knowledge (Specific Level, Basic Level)

Welding inspection

1. European Welding Inspector (Comprehensive Level, Standard Level, Basic Level)

Welding production - manual and semi-automatic welding

1. Gas-Welding European Plate Welder (Comprehensive Level)
2. Gas-Welding European Tube Welder (Comprehensive Level)
3. MIG/MAG-FCAW European Fillet Welder (Comprehensive Level)
4. MIG/MAG-FCAW European Plate Welder (Comprehensive Level)
5. MIG/MAG-FCAW European Tube Welder (Comprehensive Level)
6. MMA European Plate Welder (Comprehensive Level, Standard Level)
7. MMA European Tube Welder (Comprehensive Level, Standard Level)
8. TIG European Fillet Welder (Comprehensive Level)
9. TIG European Plate Welder (Comprehensive Level, Standard Level)
10. TIG European Tube Welder (Comprehensive Level, Standard Level)
11. MAG European Plate Welder (Standard Level)
12. MAG European Tube Welder (Standard Level)

Welding production – specialised production roles

1. European Aluminothermic Welder
2. European Arc Welder for Rail Joining
3. European Arc Welder for Rail Restoration
4. European Welding Specialists for Resistance Welding
5. European Weld Setter for Resistance Welding
6. European Trainer with Qualification for Virtual Welding Training Systems

Mechanized, robot and laser welding

1. European Diploma in Mechanized, Orbital and Robot Welding (Comprehensive Level)
2. European Diploma in Mechanized Welding (Basic Level)
3. European Diploma in Orbital Welding (Basic Level)
4. European Diploma in Robot Welding (Comprehensive Level, Basic Level)
5. European Diploma in Laser Welding (Comprehensive Level, Basic Level)
6. European Diploma in Laser Processing (Comprehensive Level, Basic Level)

Coating / surfacing process

1. European Thermal Sprayers
2. European Thermal Spraying Practitioner
3. European Thermal Spraying Specialists
4. European Diploma in Laser Surface Treatments (Comprehensive Level, Basic Level)

Adhesives

1. European Adhesive Engineer
2. European Adhesive Specialist
3. European Adhesive Bonder

Personnel certification

1. Certified European Plastics Welder
2. EWF Passport Associated with Welder Certification

Special courses

1. Special Course for European MMA Diver Welder
2. Special Course for Welding Reinforcing Bars at the Specialist Level
3. Special Course on Personnel with Responsibility for Macroscopic and Microscopic Metallographic Exam
4. Special Course on Weld Imperfections for Non-Destructive Testing Personnel
5. Special Course on Personnel with Responsibility for Heat Treatment of Welded Joints
6. Special Course on Risk Management in Welding Fabrication
7. Special Course for European Laser Safety Officer

=== Certification of welding personnel ===
Three certification schemes for personnel have been developed:

• Welding Coordination Certification has existed since 1998, was adopted by IIW in 2007 and is currently recognised worldwide, allowing Welding Coordinators to be certified according to the requirement of ISO 14731.

• Plastic Welders Certification has existed since 2004, providing training and certification according to EN 13067.

• Welders Operators and Brazers Certification exist since 2010. The goal of this scheme is to harmonise the welder's certification process, which is necessary for welder approval.

=== Certification of companies ===
EWF has created an integrated Manufacturers Certification Scheme, which complies with ISO 3834 on welding quality requirements, which is in place since 1998, ISO 14001 and OHSAS 18001 on environment and also health and safety, which are in place since 2000. The scheme has been adopted by IIW, only for the quality field.

=== Additive Manufacturing Personnel ===
The IAMQS - International Additive Manufacturing Qualification System was created by industry and for industry to ensure that companies and professionals are equipped with the right set of skills to implement AM/ 3D printing at the industrial level.

International Additive Manufacturing Qualification System (IAMQS) currently offers 11 Qualifications in Additive Manufacturing, covering Operators, Coordinator, Engineers, Designers and Supervisor.

- The management of the International AM Qualification System is done by EWF;
- The EWF System is recognized worldwide for the development of an international system based on the EWF Education, Training and Qualification Guidelines and Rules;
- EWF provides innovative training guidelines that cover front-end emerging technologies in Additive Manufacturing (AM) at an industrial level, offering individual learning pathways opportunities;
- Supports companies seeking to achieve compliance with international standardisation.

==== IAMQS Qualifications ====
Operators

1. Operator Powder Bed Fusion – Laser Beam (I MAM O PBF-LB)
2. Operator Directed Energy Deposition – Laser Beam (I MAM O DED-LB)
3. Operator Directed Energy Deposition – ARC (I MAM O DED-Arc)
4. Operator Powder Bed Fusion – Electron Beam (I MAM O PBF-EB)

Process engineers

1. Process Engineer Directed Energy Deposition – Laser Beam (I MAM PE DED-LB)
2. Process Engineer Directed Energy Deposition – ARC (I MAM PE DED-Arc)
3. Process Engineer Powder Bed Fusion – Laser Beam (I MAM PE PBF-LB)

Designers

1. Designer Directed Energy Deposition Processes (I MAM D-DED)
2. Designer for PBF Processes (I MAM D-PBF)
3. Designer for Polymers (I AM D-P)

Coordinators and supervisors

1. Coordinator (I MAM C)
2. Supervisor (I MAM S)

=== Projects ===
A good part of EWF's activities have been related to its participation in European cooperation projects, in particular under the European Commission's programmes such as Lifelong Learning 2007-2013, 7th Framework Programme, Erasmus+ and H2020.

The project focuses on modernisation of teaching methods, harmonisation of qualifications, support for learning, implementation and benchmarking to other teaching areas. It covers a variety of areas like additive manufacturing, health and safety, microbonding, laser processing and adhesives that go beyond welding and joining but target manufacturing as a whole.
