= Johnny K. Larsson =

Swedish automotive engineer

Johnny K. Larsson (born 19 July 1949) is a Swedish engineer and Technical Specialist, Body-in-White Joining Technologies, at Volvo Car Corporation, where he focuses on joining technologies for passenger car body structures.

== Curriculum vitae ==
Johnny Larsson studied and obtained his MSc at the Technical University of Lund. He presented more than 200 conference papers and published over 100 technical articles worldwide.

He is an experienced chairman at international conferences on joining technologies such as SAE conferences, IBEC, ISATA and IIW conferences. He is board member of ACI (Automotive Circle International) and member of NOLAMP (Nordic Laser Manufacturing Processes) and LANE (Laser Assisted Net Shape Engineering). He participates in scientific committees of PuD-F (Prüfung und Dokumentation – Fügetechnik), a German automotive consortium with the objective to harmonize qualification routines for the joinability of new materials grades.

He chairs the Swedish Laser Association and is an active member of the Swedish Welding Commission and the Swedish Agency for Innovation Systems (Vinnova). He participates in European projects such as EUCAR and Brite-EURAM related to advanced body-in-white joining and has contributed to the continuity of education for engineers through his involvement in organizations like EUROMOTOR and the European Laser Academy. He also gave courses at Chalmers University of Technology (CTH) and the Royal Institute of Technology (KTH).

At the begin of his career he worked from February 1978 to March 1986 on heavy truck engineering at Fleron Co. International, where he customised Volvo, Scania, Mercedes and MAN trucks and trailers. In March 1986 he started in body-in-white engineering at Volvo Car Corporation, where he developed and applied test procedures and specific know-how in joining technologies, materials science, crashworthiness engineering and structural mechanics.

He is now the technical specialist, BIW Joining Technologies, at Volvo. He is an expert in joining technologies including all types of thin sheet metal welding (resistance welding, laser welding and gas metal arc welding), brazing technologies, mechanical joining (clinch joining, self-piercing riveting, punch fasteners, hemming and high and low strength screw joints) and structural adhesive bonding. He specialised in the harmonization of design guidelines, requirements and quality assurance for joining methods with Renault Automobiles, Ford Motor Company, Land Rover and Jaguar Cars. He was an R&D coordinator for body-in-white and exterior trim and specified the relevant test requirements and conducted competitor analysis. During his employment at Volvo he kept positions as R&D coordinator body-in-white for Volvo/Renault and body-in-white joining coordinator for Volvo/Ford.

== Honors and awards ==
- 2004: Finalist of VCC Quality Award: Join-NET – A Global Joining Database
- 2004: Winner of Henry Ford Technical Award: The VCC Joining Centre and High Quality Welding of the XC90 Car Body

== Publications ==
- Larsson, J.K., "Laser technology – Making new engineering solutions possible," Proc. 3rd Conf. on Laser Materials Processing in the Nordic Countries, NOLAMP3, Lappeenranta, August 1991, ISBN 951-763-670-9.
- Larsson, J.K., "One decade of experience from laser materials processing – A powerful foundation for improved product quality," Proc. 26th ISATA Conf. (plenary paper), Aachen, September 1993, ISBN 0 947719 57 1.
- Larsson, J.K., "The introduction of roof laser welding in car production and the development of a new fixation technique," Proc. Laser Assisted Net Shape Engineering, LANE'94, Erlangen, October 1994, Meissenbach Bamberg Verlag, ISBN 3-87525-061-3.
- Larsson, J.K., "Focusing the Nd:YAG laser beam onto the automotive industry," Proc. Advances in Materials and Processing Technologies, AMPT'95, Dublin, August 1995.
- Larsson, J.K. and Palmquist, N., "Laser welding on the new Volvo XC90," Proc. 9th Conf. on Laser Materials Processing in the Nordic Countries, NOLAMP9, Trondheim, August 2003.
- Larsson, J.K. and Palmquist, N., "Extensive laser processing on the New Volvo C70 convertible," Proc. Automotive Laser Applications Workshop, ALAW'06, Plymouth, MI, March 2006.
- Larsson, J.K., "Laserlöten – Eine neue Technologie für kosmetische Fugen im PKW Rohbau," Tagungsband Große Schweißtechnische Tagung, Aachen, September 2006.
- Larsson, J.K. and Palmquist, N., "Various laser processing for the new Volvo S80 luxury sedan," Proc. 8th European Automotive Laser Applications Workshop, EALA, Bad Nauheim, January 2007.
- Larsson, J.K. and Palmquist, N., "The Volvo XC60 – a novel model featuring new laser applications for increased car body strength properties and enhanced quality," Proc. 10th European Automotive Laser Applications Workshop, EALA, Bad Nauheim, February 2009.
- Larsson, J.K., "Designed for laser welding," Industrial Laser Solutions, May 2009.
- Larsson, J.K. and Palmquist, N., "Improved car body performance for the Volvo XC60 model through the extensive utilization of laser technology," Proc. 12th European Automotive Congress, EAEC, Bratislava, June 2009.
- Larsson, J.K., "Avoidance of crack inducement when laser welding hot-formed car body components – A variable analysis," Proc. Laser Assisted Net Shape Engineering, LANE'10, Erlangen, September 2010.
- Larsson, J.K., Palmquist N. and Todal U., "Challenges with laser welding in UHSS boron steels," Proc. 13th European Automotive Laser Applications Workshop, EALA, Bad Nauheim, February 2012.
- Larsson, J.K. and Palmquist, N., "Two intensively laser welded body versions built on one platform and manufactured in two plants," Proc. 12th European Automotive Laser Applications Workshop, EALA, Bad Nauheim, February 2011.
