= Bevan Braithwaite =

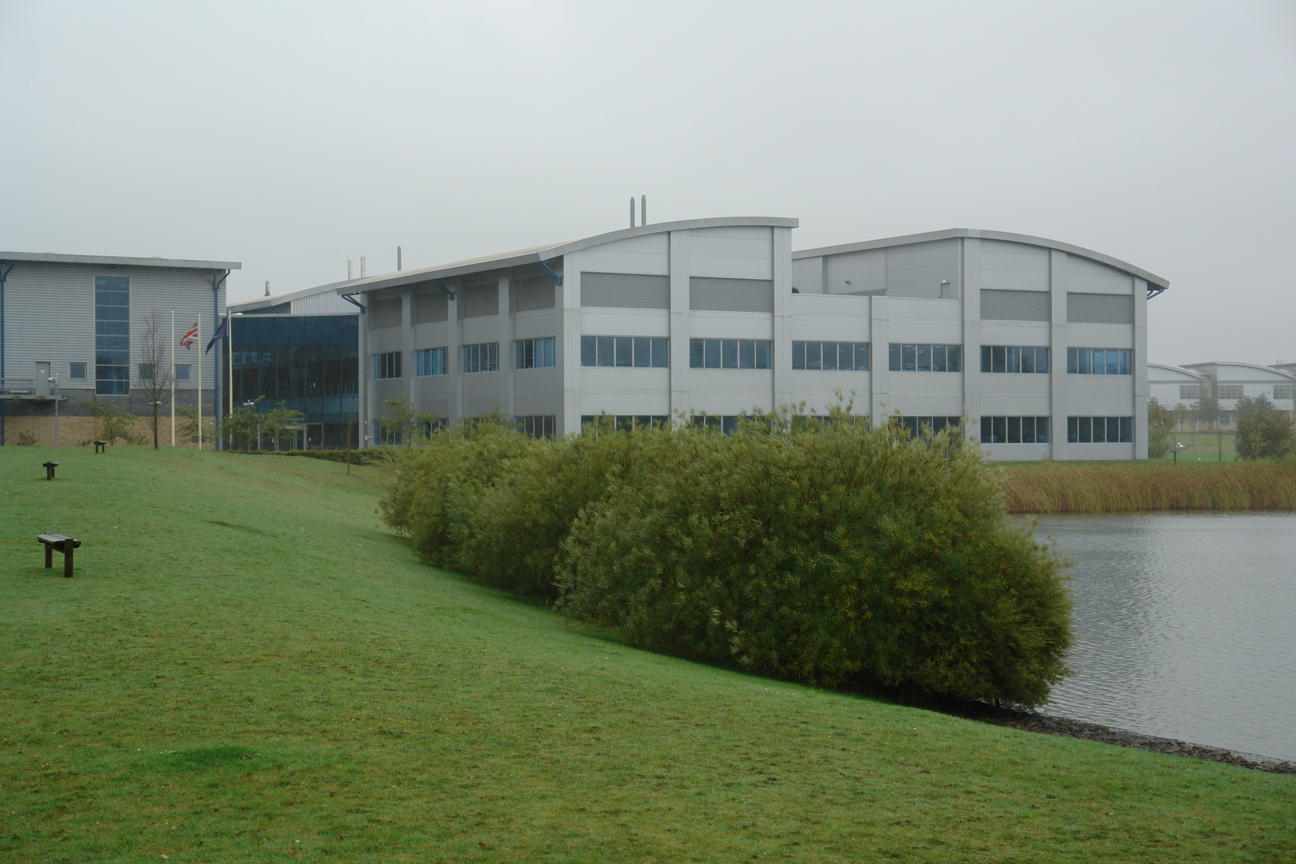
The Bevan Braithwaite Building of TWI Ltd

Arthur Bevan Midgley Braithwaite (27 July 1939 in Hoddesdon, Hertfordshire – 25 April 2008) was chief executive of The Welding Institute and founding director of Granta Park in Cambridge.

== Education ==
Bevan was from a renowned Quaker family. His father was a stockbroker and his grandfather was involved in the set-up of the Saffron Walden Railway. Bevan was brought up by his stepmother Nora (née Ford-Smith), because his Norwegian mother did not survive the postpartum period after the birth of Bevan's younger sister, in 1946. He was educated at Leighton Park School and Jesus College, Cambridge, where he obtained an MA in engineering.

== Welding engineering ==
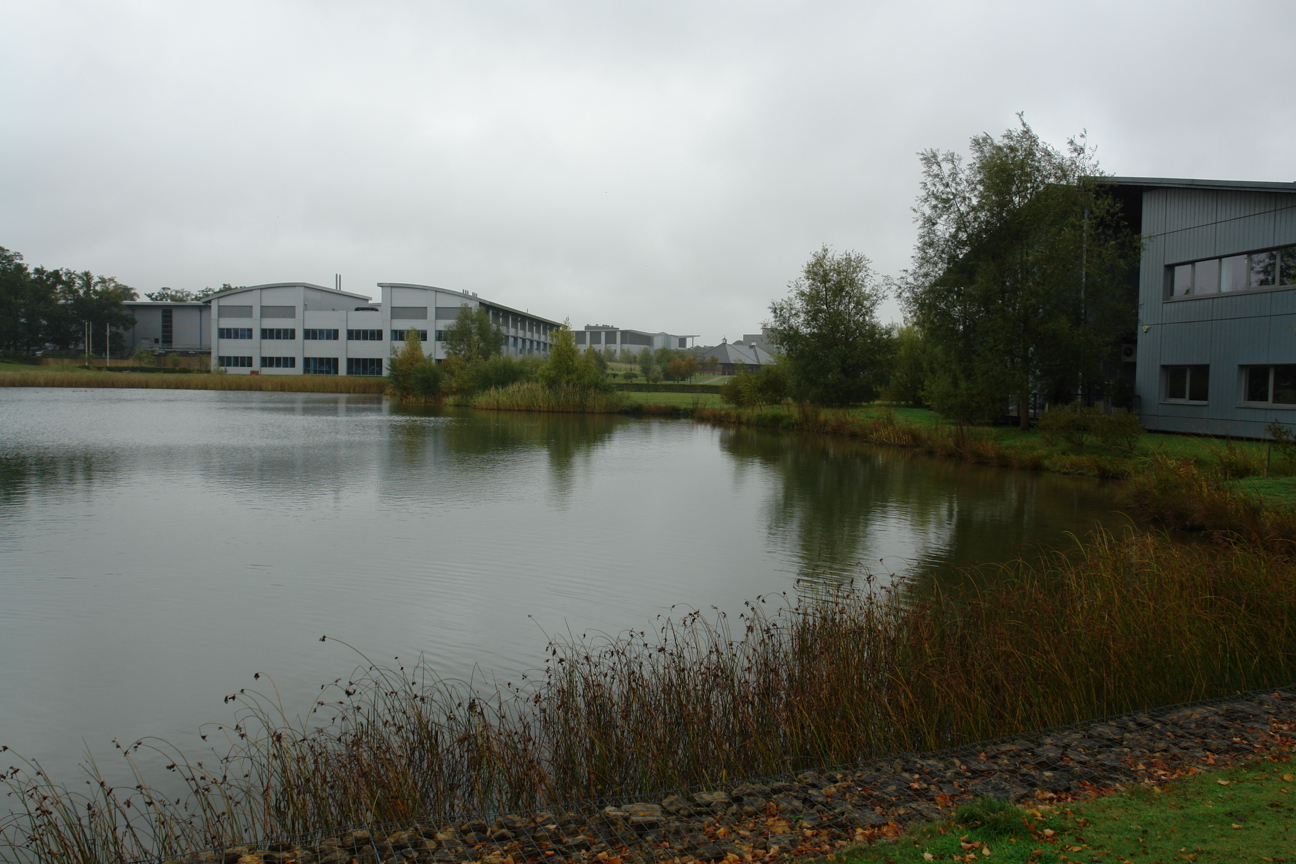
The Lake at Granta Park near Cambridge

After obtaining a qualification as a class 1 welder, in 1961 he joined the British Welding Research Association (which subsequently became The Welding Institute and then TWI Ltd), where he conducted research on the fatigue strength of structural steel and on friction welding. In 1988, he was appointed chief executive of The Welding Institute and in 1991 was granted an OBE. He was president of the International Institute of Welding and a fellow of the Royal Academy of Engineering. In 1997, he conceived building a science park around the deteriorating buildings of TWI, going on to build new offices and laboratories for the company in its centre at Granta Park, Cambridge.

== Railway engineering ==
Bevan got a passion for railways from the headmaster of The Downs School in Colwall, Malvern, Worcestershire, who managed the Downs Light Railway with a track gauge of 9 1/2 in (241 mm). He set-up the Institute of Rail Welding in 2001, built a narrow gauge railway line at Granta Park and became chairman of the Bressingham Steam Preservation Trust, at Bressingham, near Diss, Norfolk, to which he donated an ex-NCB 1991 Hunslet battery-electric locomotive and three bogie coaches from the Southport Pier Railway He eagerly supported the restoration of the steam locomotive Royal Scot, which had run on the west coast main line from London to Glasgow from 1927 to 1962.
