= The Abingtons =

Two villages in Cambridgeshire, England

Coordinates: 52.11548°N 0.23163°E

The Abingtons: Great & Little Abington
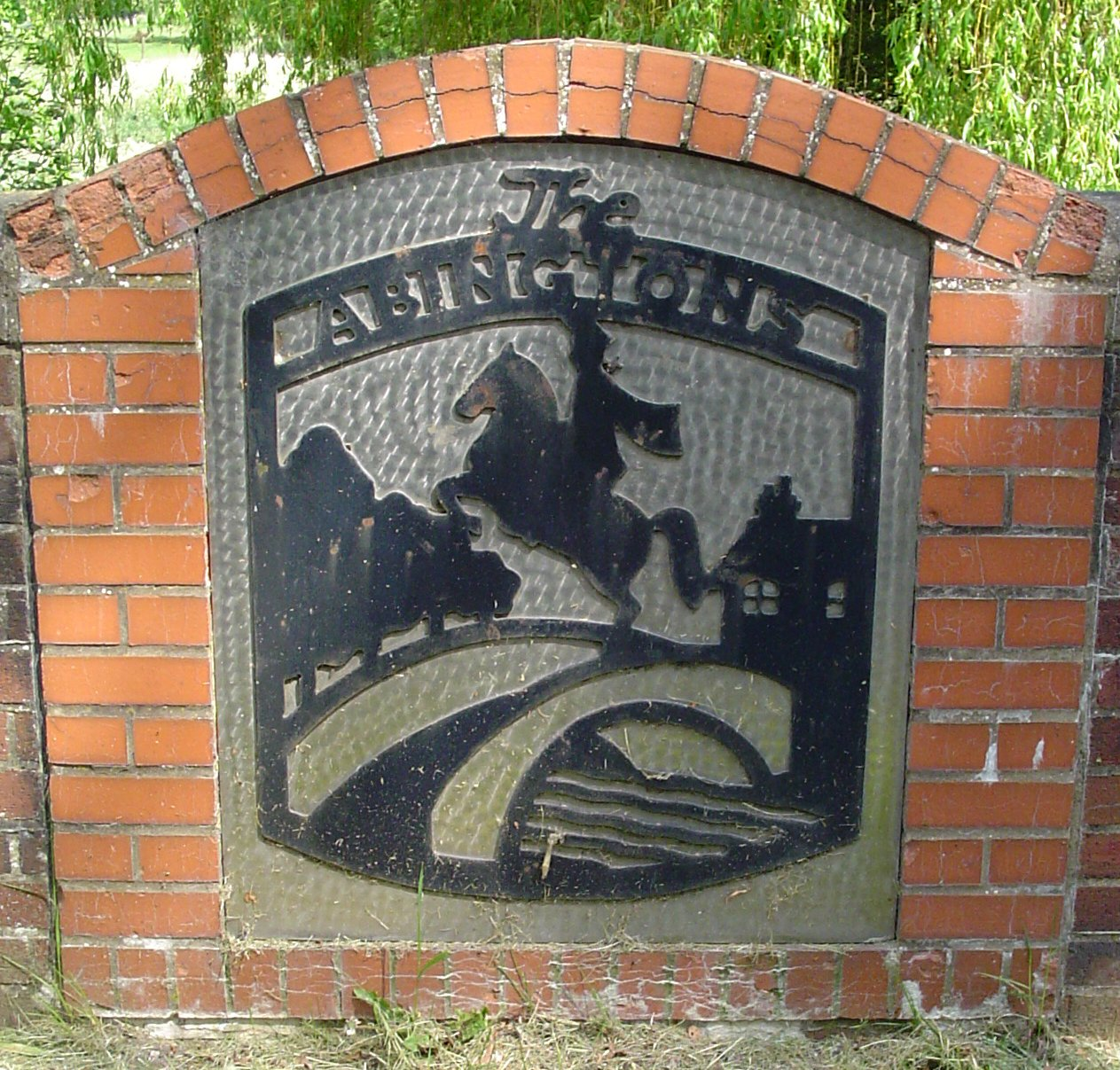
- Bridge between Little Abington and Great Abington

- Location within Cambridgeshire
- Population: 1,383; 1354 (2011 Census)
- OS grid reference: TL529487
- District: South Cambridgeshire
- Shire county: Cambridgeshire
- Region: East
- Country: England
- Sovereign state: United Kingdom
- Post town: CAMBRIDGE
- Postcode district: CB21
- Dialling code: 01223
- Police: Cambridgeshire
- Fire: Cambridgeshire
- Ambulance: East of England
- UK Parliament: Cambridgeshire South East

The Abingtons are a community in South Cambridgeshire consisting of two small villages: Little Abington and Great Abington, about 7 miles (11 km) south east of Cambridge.

== History ==
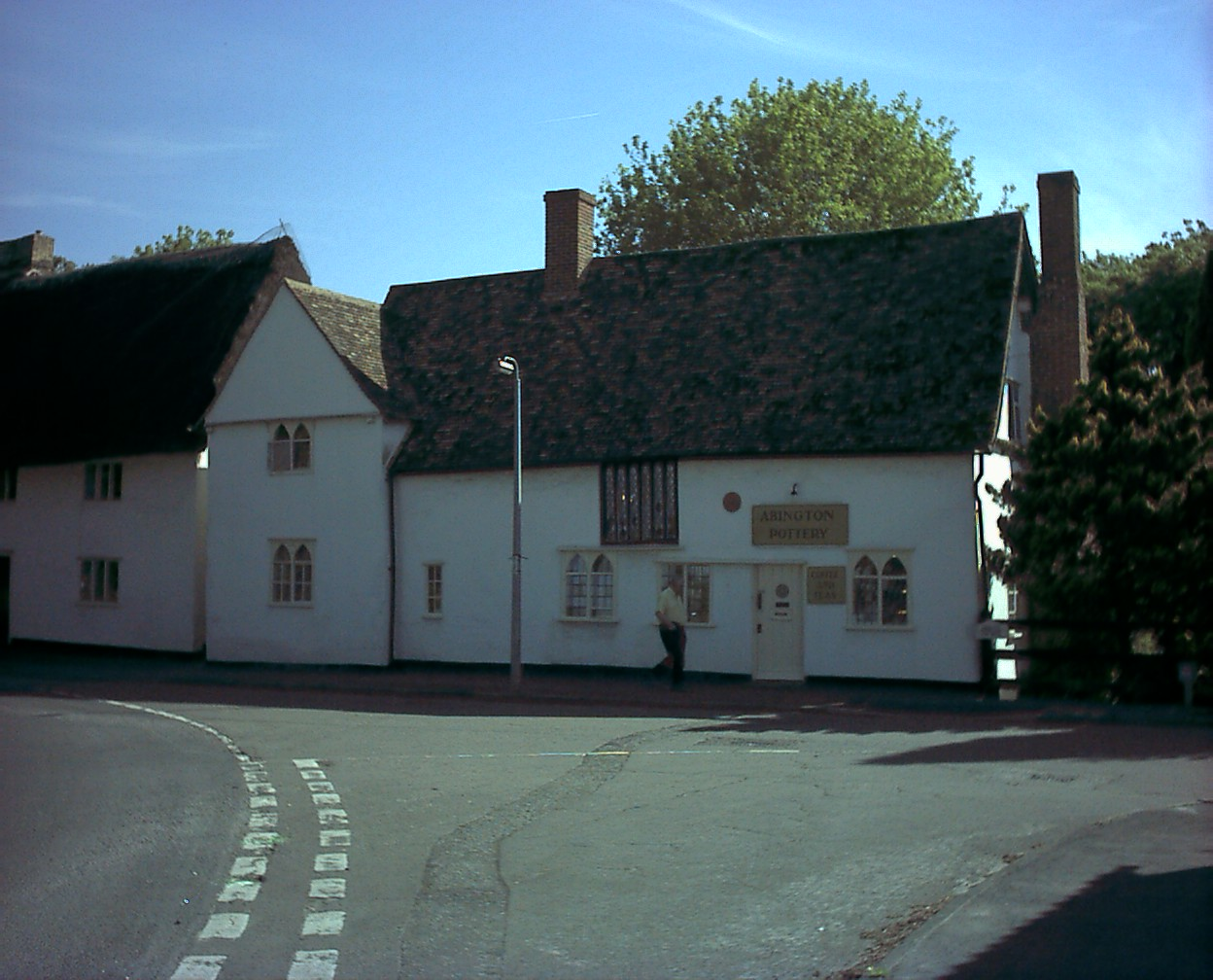
The Abingtons

Though often listed as a single entity, Great and Little Abington have since early medieval times been two parishes divided by the River Granta and remain so. The southernmost of the two, Great Abington, covers 1,588 acres (6.43 km^{2}) and is bounded to the south by the county border with Essex, to the west by a branch of the Icknield Way (now the A11), and to the east by the parish of Hildersham. Little Abington covers 1,309 acres (5.30 km^{2}), again bordered by the Icknield Way and Hildersham to the west and east, and by the ancient thoroughfare of Wool Street to the north.

The village history dates back to the Bronze Age, some 4000 years ago. The Saxons gave the village its name, originally called "estate named after Abba", and the village was listed as Abintone in the Domesday Book. The 'Great' and 'Little' prefixes came later: the Latin magna is observed from 1218 and the Modern English great from 1523 while the Latin parva is observed from 1218 and the Middle English littel from 1336.

In the decades before the Second World War the Land Settlement Association created a site to the south of Great Abington consisting of over sixty houses and plots of land for unemployed miners mainly from the former shipyards of Tyneside and coalfields of Yorkshire and Durham.

The Cambridge to Haverhill railway line that opened in 1865 crossed Great Abington just south of the village, but closed in 1967. The medieval Cambridge to Colchester road that was the main route through the village was by-passed in the 1960s.

== Churches ==
Great Abington's parish church has been dedicated to St Mary since at least the 16th century and comprises a chancel, nave with south aisle and porch, and west tower. The majority of the present building dates from the 13th century, possibly earlier, including the two-storey tower with short leaded spire.

Little Abington's parish church is also dedicated to St Mary, and has been since at least the 16th century. The present building consists of a chancel, nave with north chapel and south porch, and west tower. The nave is believed to date from around 1100, and the chancel was rebuilt in the 13th century. The three-storey tower is probably 14th century.

A Protestant chapel was built in Little Abington towards the end of the 19th century. It closed in late 2019 and the land has now been sold. Demolition of the chapel has been confirmed.

== Village life ==
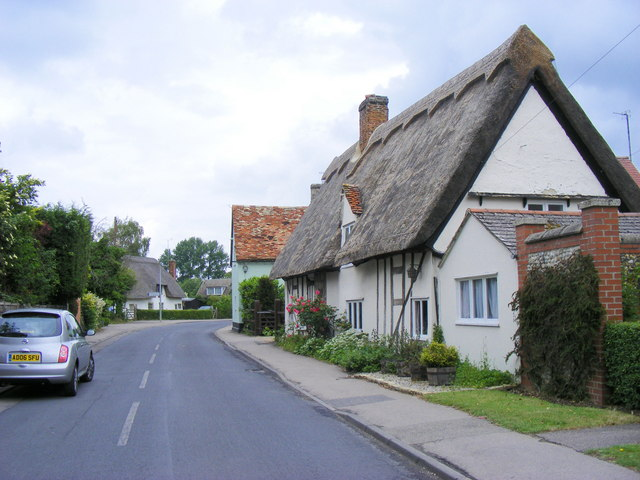
Great Abington

The village has a primary school, village shop, pub, football and cricket team and a large number of local businesses, most of them at Granta Park including The Welding Institute which started in Abington Hall in 1946. In 2009 Abington cricket club played a friendly against Babraham cricket club to commemorate 150 years of the cricket team.

The village also has a village hall, called The Abington Institute, which has a café, a large main hall with video projection and an audio system allowing the showing of films and presentations. It also has a meeting room, another large room overlooking the cricket pitch and two changing rooms with showers. The Institute is used by many local clubs and organisations and also hosts regular lunches for older Abington residents.

The remaining public house, The Three Tuns in Great Abington, is a 17th-century building that was possibly open in 1687 and certainly by 1756. Former pubs in Little Abington include The Crown which closed in the late 20th century, and The Bricklayers' Arms, which opened in the mid-19th century and was sold in 1912. The Princess (later Prince) of Wales in Great Abington opened at the end of the 19th century and closed in about 1963. The King's Arms opened on the Stump Cross to Newmarket road (now the A11) just north of Bourn Bridge in the late 17th century, closing in 1850 with the advent of the railway. The antiquary William Cole was born there while his father was publican. The White Hart opened on the same road just south of the bridge in around 1750, but closed by the end of the century.

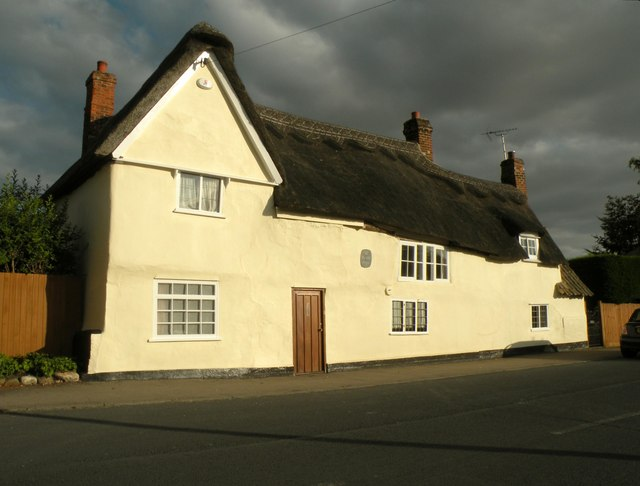
Great Abington Cottage
