= Adhesive bonding =

Joining technique used in manufacture and repair

Adhesive bonding is a joining technique used in the manufacture and repair of a wide range of products. Along with welding and soldering, adhesive bonding is one of the basic joining processes. In this technique, components are bonded together using adhesives. The broad range of types of adhesives available allows numerous materials to be bonded together in products as diverse as vehicles, mobile phones, personal care products, buildings, computers and medical devices.

== History ==
An adhesive can be defined as a substance that causes two surfaces to stick together. By this definition, the earliest "adhesive" could be considered to have been developed three billion years ago, when primordial cells produced a tacky outer membrane allowing them to stick to adjacent cells. The first use of adhesives by humans can be dated to around 220,000 B.C., when tar from birch tree bark was used to glue stone arrowheads to a shaft.

== Basics ==
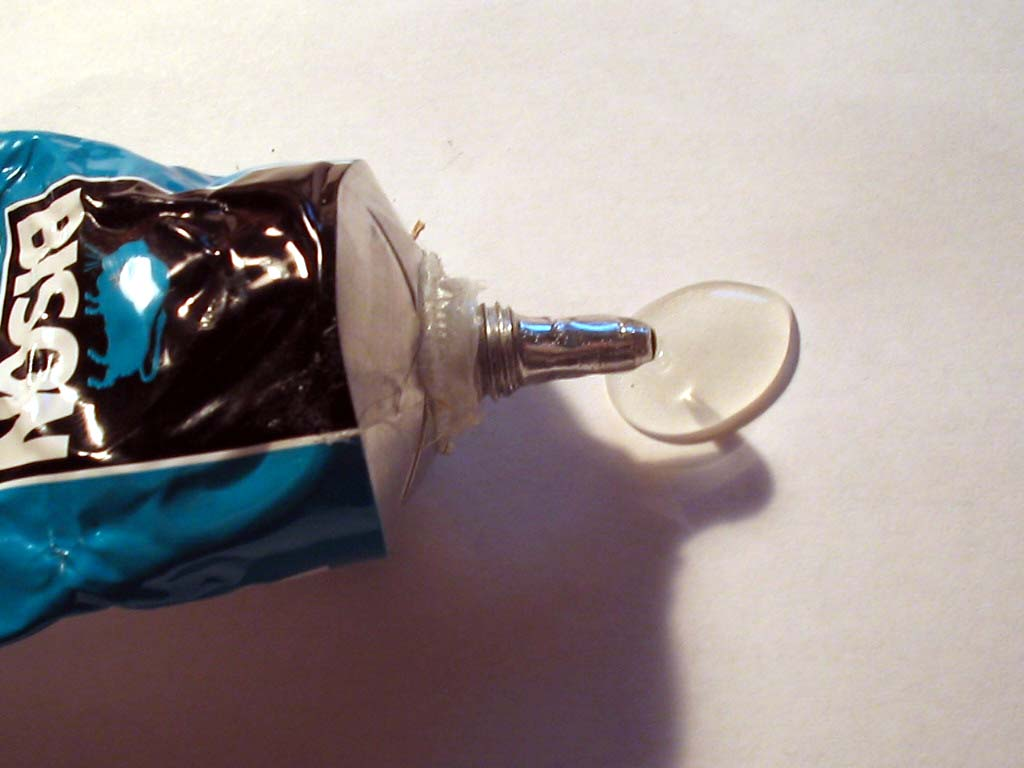
Universal adhesive

According to the definition of EN 923: "Adhesives. Terms and definitions", adhesives are non-metallic substances capable of joining materials by surface bonding (adhesion), with a bond possessing adequate internal strength (cohesion)". The adhesive forms the connecting element between the two joined parts, which would not stick together without it. Adhesives can be grouped by chemistry, by application, or by the reaction mechanism.

=== Adhesion ===
According to IUPAC, adhesion is the "process of attachment of a substance to the surface of another substance". Interactions between the adhesive and substrate have a very short range of less than one nanometre. Therefore, good wetting of the materials to be joined by the adhesive in its liquid state is required to produce a high quality bond. In addition to the wetting ability, the adhesive and substrate must have compatible molecular groups so that interaction between the adhesive and substrate can take place and thus achieve adhesion.

The adhesive forces are usually based on physical interactions, for example, such as those between polar or polarisable groups, on hydrogen bonds, or van der Waals forces. When bonding plastics, in particular with solvent-based adhesives, diffusion processes can also play a role. In this case, the plastic at the substrate surface is dissolved by the solvent contained in the adhesive. This leads to an increased mobility of the plastic's polymer chains, which in turn allows penetration by those of the adhesive. Ultimately, additional interactions occur between the polymer chains of the adhesive and the substrate. After evaporation of the solvent, a solid compound is formed. Chemical bonds are also important in certain adhesive / substrate combinations, for example when bonding glass using silicone adhesives, wood using polyurethane adhesives and aluminium using epoxy adhesives. Chemical bonding leads to significantly higher adhesion than physical bonding. In addition, penetration of the liquid adhesive into undercuts may provide addition adhesion after it has hardened.

Achieving adhesion between the adhesive and substrate requires not only an adhesive of suitable composition for the substrate, but also places high demands on the substrate surface. Due to the short range of the adhesion forces, the nature of the surface layer of the substrate is crucial. It must be sufficiently firmly connected to the body of the substrate. For example, many adhesives adhere well to a corroded steel surface. However, the corrosion layer – the rust – is not firmly connected to the substrate. Under load, failure may occur in the corroded material or between the rust layer and the uncorroded steel. The same applies to coated items. The adhesive must build adhesion to the coating. The coating in turn must be sufficiently firmly connected to the substrate.

Likewise, contaminants, especially those which, due to their low surface tension, counteract wetting by the adhesive (for example, oils, release agents, etc.) hinder the adhesion interaction. Contaminants form, as it were, a barrier between the adhesive and the substrate which cannot be bridged by the adhesion forces due to their short reach.

Therefore, contaminants usually need to be removed before adhesion. Some special adhesives show a degree of compatibility with certain oils. They are able to absorb certain oils during the curing of the adhesive, which takes place at elevated temperatures, and thus to remove them from the boundary layer between the adhesive and substrate. Such adhesives are used for example in automotive body shops. They allow the gluing of sheet metal parts with corrosion protection and drawing oils without previous cleaning; The curing of the adhesive takes place in the furnaces used subsequently for hardening the lacquer at temperatures between approximately 150 and 200 °C.

=== Pre-treatment ===
Pre-treatment can be used to modify surfaces in a targeted way and thus make them more adhesive. In addition to coating the substrates with an adhesion promoter (primer) to enable good adhesion, surfaces can also be modified by various methods to prepare them for gluing. The most common surface pre-treatment methods are listed in the adjacent figure.

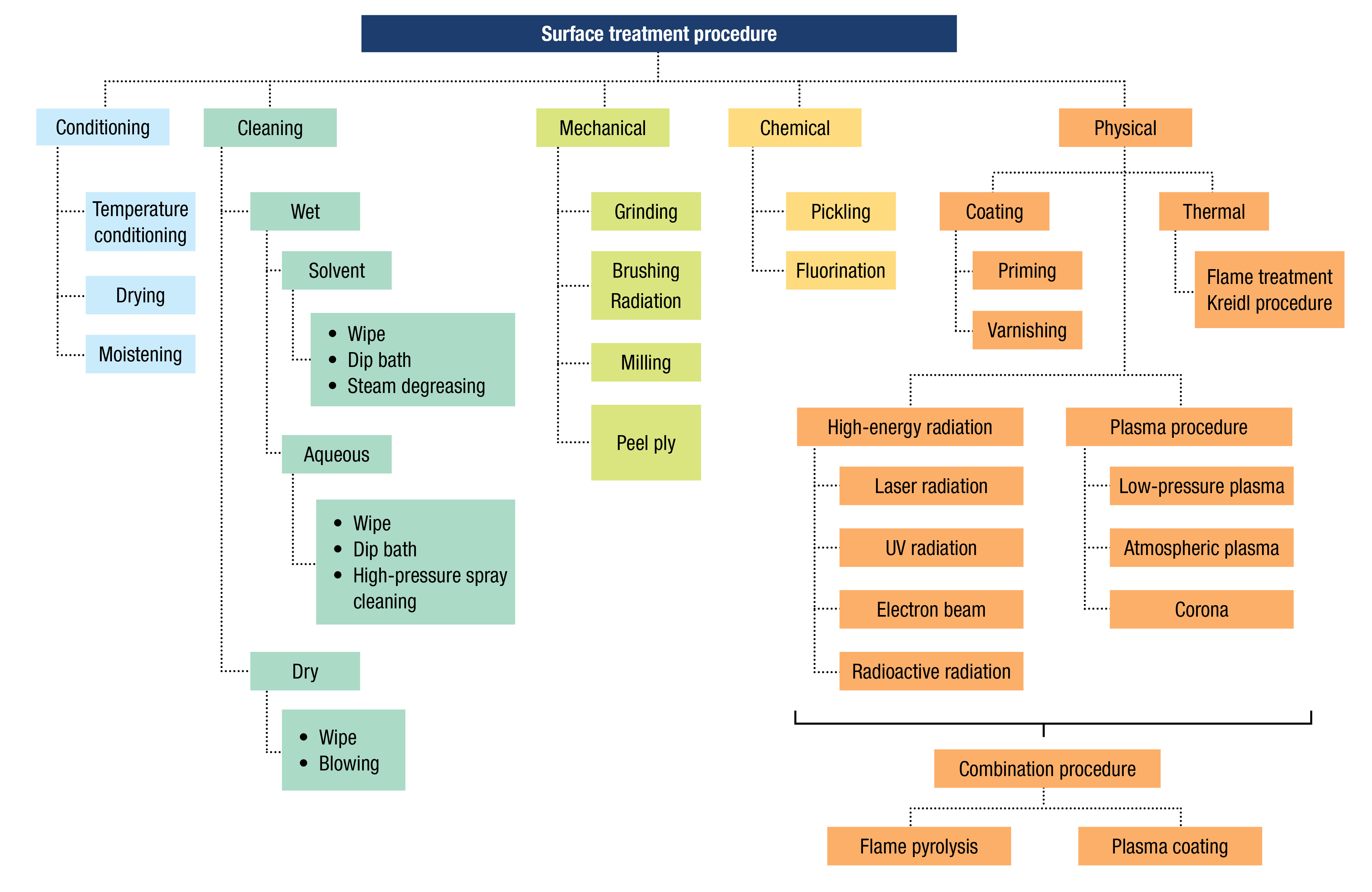
The most important processes for surface pre-treatment (after H. Gleich)

The selection of the pre-treatment process is application-specific, taking into account

- The materials to be joined.
- Their surface condition.
- The type and amount of surface contamination.
- The adhesive to be used for bonding the substrates.
- The stresses on the glued product over its life cycle (e.g. mechanical, thermal or medial).

The selection should be validated through appropriate testing.

=== Hardening of the glue – cohesion ===
As the adhesive solidifies, its internal strength, the cohesion, increases. The cohesion is also based on physical interactions, in this case between the adhesive polymers. In the case of adhesives which cure by a chemical reaction, i.e. the formation of polymers by a chemical reaction of the adhesive constituents, the resulting chemical bonds play an important role.

=== Properties of a bond ===
The cohesive and adhesive properties of the adhesive in combination with the substrate determine the properties of a bond. While the adhesion properties substantially determine whether an adhesive adheres to a particular substrate, the cohesive property contributes greatly to the mechanical properties of the bond, particularly the load-bearing deformation behaviour.

Adhesive bonds are not only subject to certain aging characteristics, but their properties are dependent on the particular environmental conditions, in particular the temperature. Also, both the adhesion-forming interactions between adhesive and substrate, as well as the inter-intramolecular interactions causing the cohesion, can be adversely affected by external influences (including temperature, humidity, chemicals, radiation, mechanical stress). The degree of impairment depends on the nature of the conditions and their duration; this process is called aging. Therefore, when planning a bonding operation, in addition to the actual environmental conditions, their possible long-term effects on the adhesive and substrate must also be taken into account.

Due to the large number of parameters that can influence bonding and the partly conflicting requirements for different adhesive bonds, it is clear that the so-called "all-purpose adhesive" cannot exist.

=== Adhesive selection ===
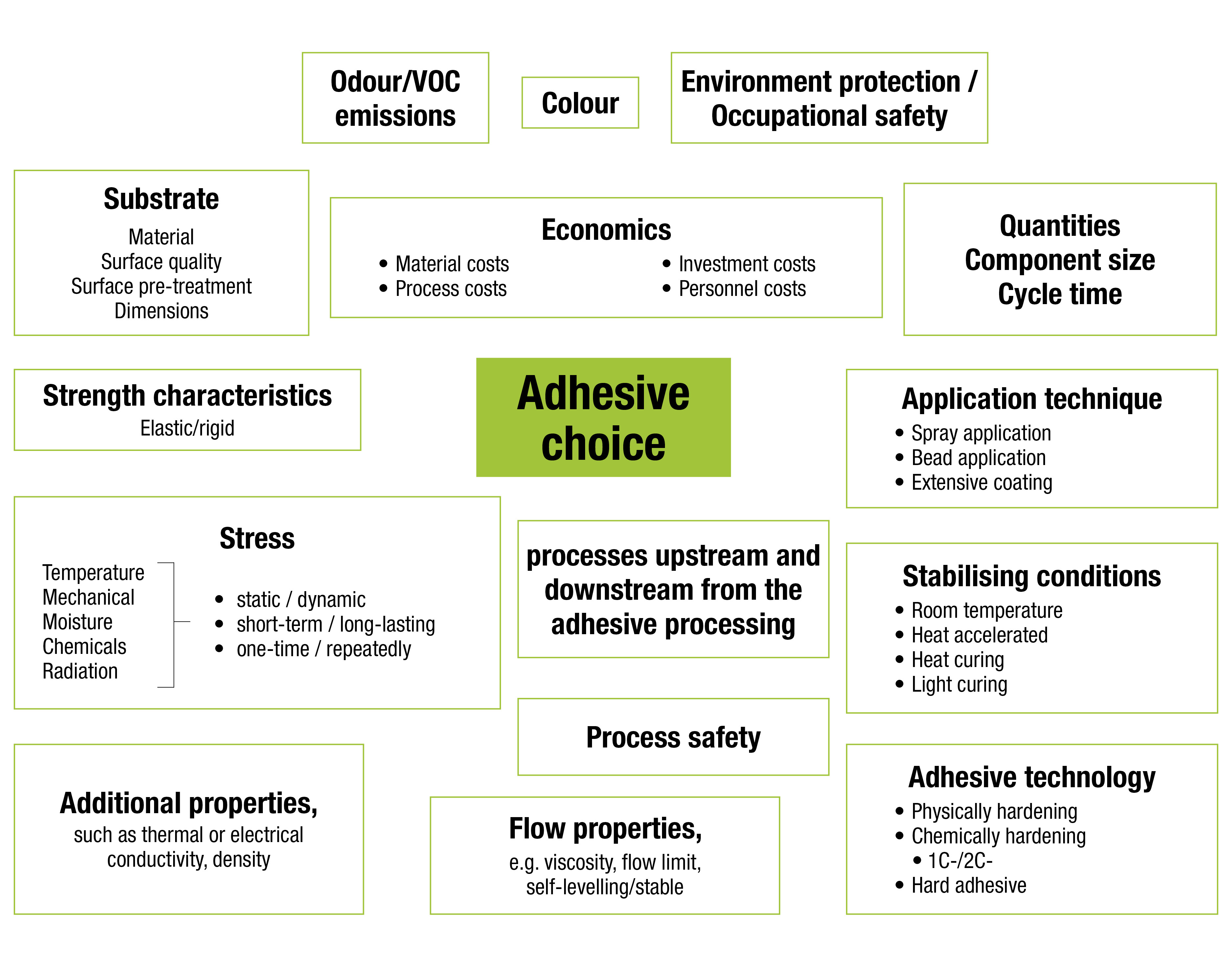
Criteria to consider when selecting adhesives

The selection of a suitable adhesive for a particular application should be based on a specific requirement profile. This requirement profile lists all immediate, verifiable requirements for the component to be bonded and, as a result, for the bond and the adhesive. It is possible to distinguish between requirements which must be met and those whose fulfilment is advantageous but not absolutely necessary. In addition, specifications derived from the bonding process, including those from upstream and downstream process steps, must be taken into account. The diagram above provides a summary of the most important parameters to take into account when choosing adhesives.

== Advantages and disadvantages of gluing ==
As with any joining technique, bonding technology not only offers a wide range of possibilities and many advantages, but also has limitations that must be considered when planning and designing adhesive processes.

=== Advantages of gluing ===
The main advantages are:

- Almost all materials can be bonded to themselves or other materials by gluing.
- Due to the areal force transmission, a uniform distribution of the forces is achieved over the entire bonding area. This makes optimum use of the substrate properties.
- By choosing a correspondingly large bonding area, relatively high forces can also be transmitted between thin substrates, which is particularly advantageous for lightweight construction applications.
- By choosing an elastic adhesive, movements of the substrates relative to each other can be compensated for. For example, it is possible to compensate for component elongations in the event of temperature fluctuations and to dampen vibrations effectively, thus avoiding material damage or fatigue of the substrate.
- There is no material damage to the substrate through drill holes for rivets or screws, etc.
- Visually appealing surfaces can be achieved.
- Zero or only a slight heat load is associated with the bonding, so that thermal distortion, thermal stresses or changes in the microstructure and, as a consequence, a change in the mechanical properties of the substrate are largely avoided.
- Substrate tolerances can be compensated for by means of gap-filling adhesives
- Gluing is equally suitable for both small and large parts. Thus, in microelectronics only a few micrograms of adhesive are required per component, while in the production of rotor blades for wind turbines, several hundred kilograms per component are needed.
- In addition to power transmission, additional properties can be incorporated, such as:
  - Connection sealing.
  - Acoustic decoupling and damping.
  - Electrical insulation (avoidance of contact corrosion)
  - Electrical conductivity.
  - Thermally insulation.
  - Thermally conductivity (for example, thermal management of electronic components).

=== Disadvantages ===
There are many types of adhesive available and they are often developed with a specific use in mind. As a result, what could be perceived as a disadvantage of a particular adhesive type in some applications could be its advantage in another. Therefore, it is essential to use a glue that is appropriate for the application at hand. Characteristics of adhesives that can be disadvantages in certain situations include:

- In general, instantaneous bond strength is not achieved. However, pressure-sensitive adhesives used in double-sided adhesive tapes, rapidly curing "superglue" cyanoacrylate, and many light-curing adhesives do achieve significant initial strength after completion of the joining process or very shortly thereafter, although not their ultimate strength required for further processing of the glued assembly.
- Depending on the chemical basis, some adhesive types have limited thermal and chemical resistance and the mechanical properties of the bond are temperature dependent. Therefore, choose a type of adhesive that has been developed to have good thermal and chemical resistance, such as reactive hot melt adhesives.
- Some adhesives may exhibit a slight tendency to creep. Choose an adhesive designed not to creep if this is important for your application.
- The long-term stability of a bond is subject to aging processes, so make sure you choose an adhesive with a lifespan appropriate to your application.
- Some types of adhesive cannot be removed without damaging at least one of the substrates. Others are easier to remove.
- Bonding is a so-called "special process", meaning that testing cannot be achieved completely by non-destructive methods. Therefore, an understanding of the bonding process must be mastered to avoid errors. DIN 2304-1 (Adhesive Bonding Technology - Quality Requirements for Adhesive Bonding - Part 1: Bonding Process Chain) specifies the requirements for a quality-compliant design of load-transferring adhesive bonds along the bonding process chain - from development through production to reworking.
- Along with other bonding techniques, some adhesives and related materials needed for the bonding process (such as solvents for cleaning, primers, etc.) are hazardous substances and require appropriate handling precautions.

=== Comparison of joining techniques ===
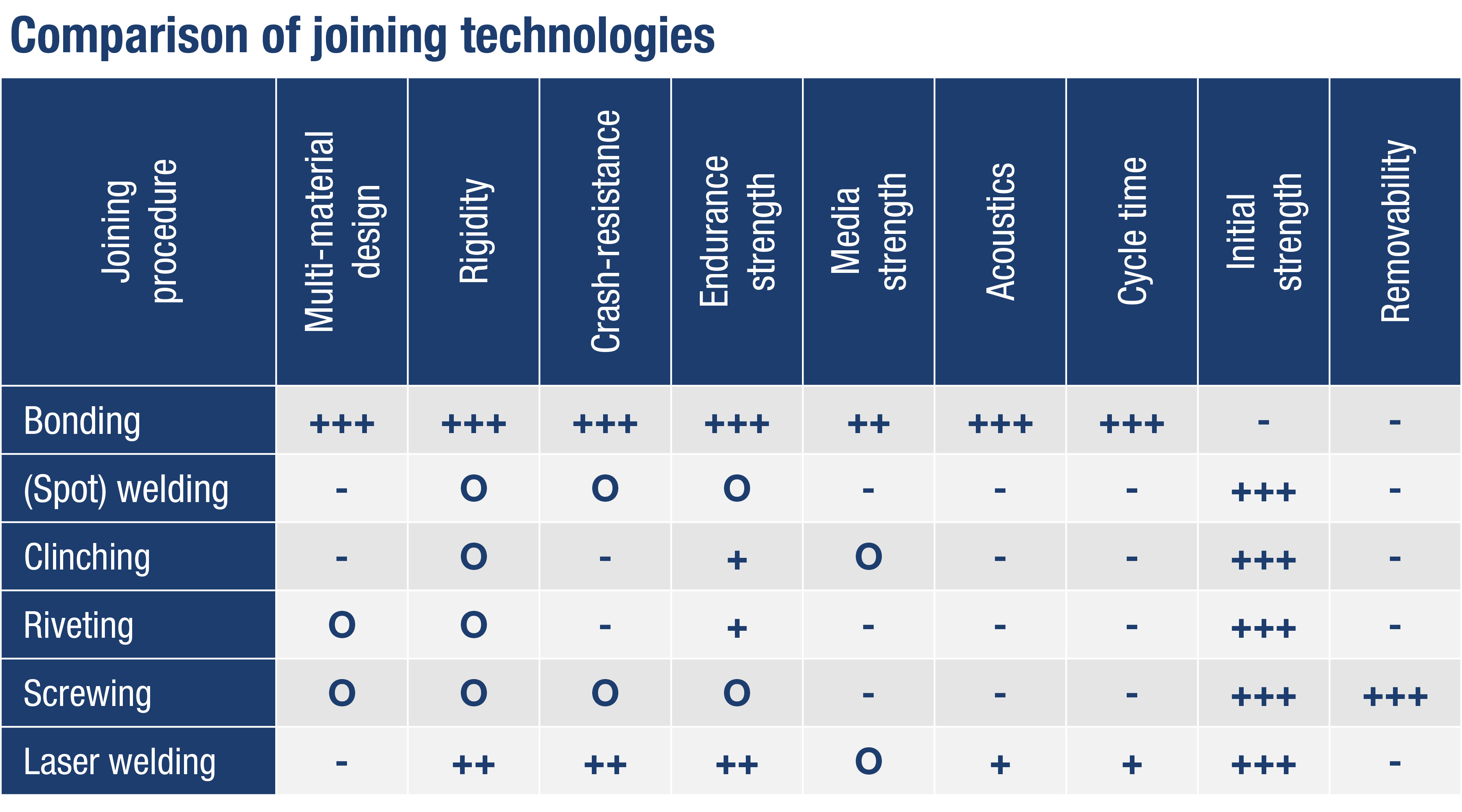
Comparison of joining techniques

Adhesive bonding may have advantages comparison with other joining methods for specific applications, as shown in the adjacent table with the example of joining metals in automotive body construction.

The disadvantage of the lack of instantaneous bonding exhibited by many adhesives can be overcome by using a suitable fast-curing adhesive or a combination of a standard adhesive with a second, fast-curing adhesive (e.g. double-sided adhesive tape) or with another joining method, such as spot welding, rivets, screws, or clinching / press joining. In the case of these processes, which are referred to as hybrid joining, because of the distributed connection of the substrates between the other joining points, there is a significant reduction in the stress peaks at precisely these joining points and instantaneous strength is achieved.

== Applications (selection) ==
Modern adhesives have become indispensable in the today's world. They can be found in everyday and specialist products. Here are some examples from different areas:

=== Automotive industry ===
The production of modern vehicles would not be possible without adhesives. Here are two examples:

==== Vehicle windscreens ====
Today's windscreens are made of laminated safety glass, which consists of two or more pieces of glass bonded to a tear-resistant, viscous, transparent hot-melt adhesive film. This film ensures among other things that the windscreen remains intact as a unit after fracture, thus minimising the risk of injury from glass fragments. Furthermore, while windscreens were previously attached to the bodywork by means of a rubber seal, today they are firmly glued and form an integral part of the bodywork. This is only possible through the use of an adhesive with the correct mechanical properties for the application; on the one hand, the adhesive offers sufficient strength to secure the windscreen to the bodywork and, on the other hand, it is sufficiently elastic to compensate for relative movements between the bodywork and windscreen during driving, thus preventing breakage. Since the glued-in windshield contributes to the rigidity of the vehicle, thinner metal sheets can be used in certain places, thereby reducing the vehicle's weight and ultimately its energy consumption.

==== Vehicle electronics ====
The advent of more and more electronics in motor vehicles, from engine management systems, safety components such as ABS and ESP and driver assistance systems, to comfort-enhancing features, would not be possible without modern adhesives. Due to the small size of the control devices, sensors, cameras, etc., the capabilities of conventional joining technologies are soon exceeded. Therefore, the components used today are predominantly bonded using adhesives.

In order to ensure the proper functioning of the control units and associated sensors, the electronics must be safely protected from external influences, such as moisture, salt, fuel and other automotive fluids. Many sensors are therefore encapsulated or protected by securely fitting housing. In both cases, adhesives are used. In the case of component casting, bubble-free potting must be achieved, and the hardened potting material must have a certain mechanical stability in order to withstand the abrasive impact of sand and gravel while driving. On the other hand, it must have sufficient elasticity to avoid shock-like thermal cycling due to different thermal expansion behaviours of the electronic components, which could lead to leaks or the rupture of solder joints and thus to failure.

Due to the steadily increasing number of electronic components, the risk of interference due to inadequate electromagnetic compatibility (EMC) also increase. To ensure adequate EMC, metal housing is used in which the lid is glued by means of special fillers containing adhesives. This ensures not only the required tightness but also the required EMC.

=== Semiconductor wafers ===
Adhesive bonding has the advantage of relatively low bonding temperature as well as the absence of electric voltage and current. Based on the fact that the wafers are not in direct contact, this procedure enables the use of different substrates, e.g. silicon, glass, metals and other semiconductor materials. A drawback is that small structures become wider during patterning which hampers the production of an accurate intermediate layer with tight dimension control. Further, the possibility of corrosion due to out-gassed products, thermal instability and penetration of moisture limits the reliability of the bonding process. Another disadvantage is the missing possibility of hermetically sealed encapsulation due to higher permeability of gas and water molecules while using organic adhesives.

=== Medicine and medical technology ===
In medicine and medical technology, adhesives play an increasingly important role. The simple plaster for example has to have good adhesion to a variety of skin types, but also be as painless as possible to remove. In addition, transdermal patches deliver medication over a longer period of time through the skin into the bloodstream, others are used for the long-term attachment of sensors used for example for the continuous measurement of blood sugar levels. These patches must stick securely for up to 14 days, sometimes under extreme conditions, for example, when showering, swimming, exercising or in a sauna. It goes without saying that these adhesives must be skin-friendly. The adhesives used are special pressure-sensitive adhesives based on acrylates or synthetic rubber.

In surgery, adhesives are used in the treatment of certain surgical wounds. These adhesives are usually based on fibrin, the natural adhesive substance that causes blood to clot when bleeding. Since fibrin occurs naturally in the body, it has the advantage that the adhesive is not rejected by the body. In addition, over time it degrades naturally by itself, which eliminates the need for elaborate after-treatment such as removing stitches. This property is especially important for surgery on the heart or the gastrointestinal tract.

Innovative adhesives are also used in dentistry. They are not only used for the filling of caries and the production of dentures but are also invaluable in orthodontics. The brackets through which the wires of a dental brace are threaded are attached to the teeth by means of special adhesives. On the one hand, the brackets should be held securely in the mouth's moist, warm environment, but later be able to be removed without residue.

Adhesives are also now indispensable in medical device technology. For example, needles are usually glued to syringes and stainless-steel cannula must be securely connected to their plastic adapter. Due to the high production volumes, short cycle times are required. Often, light-curing adhesives are used, which attain sufficient strength after a few seconds of irradiation with light of a certain wavelength and are able to survive the subsequent sterilisation process, during which they can be subjected to superheated steam, ethylene oxide or gamma radiation.

The manufacture of endoscopes, where tension-free attachment of lenses with smaller and smaller dimensions is required, is another good example of the performance capabilities of modern adhesives. Here, in addition to bond strength, it is important to balance the different thermal expansions of the substrates. In this case, it is also important to prevent voltages, which could affect the image quality, from being transmitted from the lens holder to the lens.

=== Home appliance industry ===
Adhesives are also widely used in the production of household appliances, fulfilling a range of different bonding requirements. For example, temperature-stable silicone adhesives are used in the production of ceramic hobs or sealing windows in oven doors. The compounds must be able to withstand temperatures of up to 250 °C and, of course, must never release any pollutants. On the other hand, membrane keyboards of control panels as well as the label plates for conventional control panels are attached to the devices such as ovens, refrigerators, washing machines and dryers by means of double-sided adhesive tapes.

Adhesives are also frequently used in the manufacture of small electrical appliances. For example, in coffee machines plastic handles are often glued to the glass jugs. Compared to fastening by means of a metal clamping ring, gluing offers advantages in the manufacturing process by avoiding breaking the jugs. Another advantage in use is that, with a metal clamping ring, dirt particles and moisture can accumulate between the jug body and ring, leading to corrosion of the clamping ring, rendering it unsightly. With adhesive fixing of the handle, this phenomenon is eliminated. Adhesives based on polyurethane or silicone are used, either as a two-component or moisture-curing system. The adhesive used must, among other things, have enough strength, be dishwasher safe, and have sufficient elasticity to compensate for the different thermal expansion behaviour of glass and the plastic material of the handle to prevent glass breakage, and it has to maintain this performance over the entire life of the coffee machine, even at temperatures up to 100 °C.

In addition, the production of multifunction devices, such as those that facilitate cooking, stirring, kneading, mixing and grinding, would be impossible in their current form without modern adhesives. The heart of such devices is often an extremely powerful, brushless electric motor. On the one hand it needs high speed capabilities to grind for example nuts, and on the other hand it needs high torque capabilities at low speeds to knead dough. Since some of these devices suitable for use in cooking, a corresponding temperature resistance is required. Light-curing adhesives ensure that the rotor and stator, the two main components of the motor, form a robust unit. The curing of the adhesive takes place within a very short time, so that high quantities of the device can be produced cost-effectively. During curing, the photoinitiators contained in the adhesive form highly reactive molecules under the influence of light, which facilitates the chemical curing process of the adhesive resin.

=== Packaging industry ===
Most packaging for frozen and microwaveable foodstuffs consists of biodegradable film composites. Of course, the adhesives used to make these film composites must also be biodegradable. This is achieved by the use of molecules of naturally occurring polymers, such as cellulose and starch, which can be degraded to water, carbon dioxide and biomass by microorganisms using enzymes.

=== Postage stamps ===
The Penny Black was the world's first adhesive postage stamp used in a public postal system. It was first issued in Great Britain on 1 May 1840, but was not valid for use until 6 May. The introduction of adhesive postage stamps is closely associated with developments in adhesives technology. At that time, stamp adhesives consisted of naturally occurring raw materials such as molasses, potato starch and occasionally fish glue, but these performed poorly. So, the stamps either stuck together or fell off prematurely and emitted an unpleasant odour. In addition, the stamps had to be moistened before fixing, which was often done by licking. Due to the unpleasant taste, this was rather unpopular. With the development of synthetic adhesives in the middle of the 20th century, the use of odourless adhesives with no unpleasant taste, made of polyvinyl acetate or polyvinyl alcohol, was adopted. This also eliminated the problem of stamps sticking together and premature falling off. Today, more and more stamps are offered which do not require moistening. These self-adhesive stamps use a pressure-sensitive adhesive and need only be removed from their non-stick backing paper before being glued to a letter.

== Adhesive technical standardisation, education and training ==
With the growing use of bonding technology in industry and professional trades, and the resulting, increasing demands on the quality and durability of glued products, comprehensive national and international standards have been developed for, amongst other things, the characterisation, classification and testing of adhesives and adhesive bonds.

Gluing forms only part of the occupational training in a few occupations, and in this case only the bonding processes relevant to the respective profession are usually taught. As a result, there was a need for professional training for personnel involved in the development, production and repair of glued products. This need was met through the introduction of a three-level training concept. Training is available as a bonding practitioner, bonding specialist or bonding engineer, as laid down in guidelines for the EWF (European Federation for Welding, Joining and Cutting).

In addition, trade associations, such as FEICA, the European Association of the Adhesive and Sealant Industry, are working with supply chain stakeholders to develop and harmonise standards and test methods, as well as encourage best practices in health, safety and the environment.

== Literature ==
- FEICA, History of bonding and adhesives – adhesives and sealants. 2016
- Walter Brockmann et al.: Adhesive Technology. Adhesives, applications and processes. Wiley-VCH, Weinheim 2005, ISBN 3-527-31091-6.
- Hermann Onusseit: Practical knowledge of adhesive technology. Volume 1: Basics. Hüthig, 2008, ISBN 978-3-410-21459-5.
- Gerd Habenicht: Applied Adhesive Bonding: A Practical Guide for Flawless Results. Wiley VCH, 2008, ISBN 978-3-527-62645-8.
- Industrieverband Klebstoffe e. V.: manual adhesive technology. Vieweg, Wiesbaden 2016, ISBN 978-3-658-14529-3 .
- FEICA / Industrieverband Klebstoffe e. V. Educational Materials: Bonding/Adhesives Textbook.
- Elastic Bonding in the Construction Industry. Verlag modern industry, Ralf Heinzmann, 2001, ISBN 3-478-93265-3.
- BOND it - reference work on bonding technology. DELO Industrial Adhesives, 2018.
- DVS-3310 quality requirements in adhesive technology. DVS Media, February 2012. (Directive)
- DIN 6701 Gluing of rail vehicles and vehicle parts. Beuth-Verlag, Berlin, 2007. (standard)
- Detlef Symietz, Andreas Lutz: Structural bonding in vehicle construction. Properties, applications and performance of a new joining process. (= The Library of Technology, Volume 291). Verlag Moderne Industrie, 2006, ISBN 3-937-88955-8.
- DIN 2304-1 Adhesive Technology - Quality Requirements for Adhesive Processes. Part 1: Process Chain. Gluing Beuth-Verlag, Berlin 2016.
