= The Welding Institute =

British metal-joining research and promotion firm

TWI Ltd / The Welding Institute
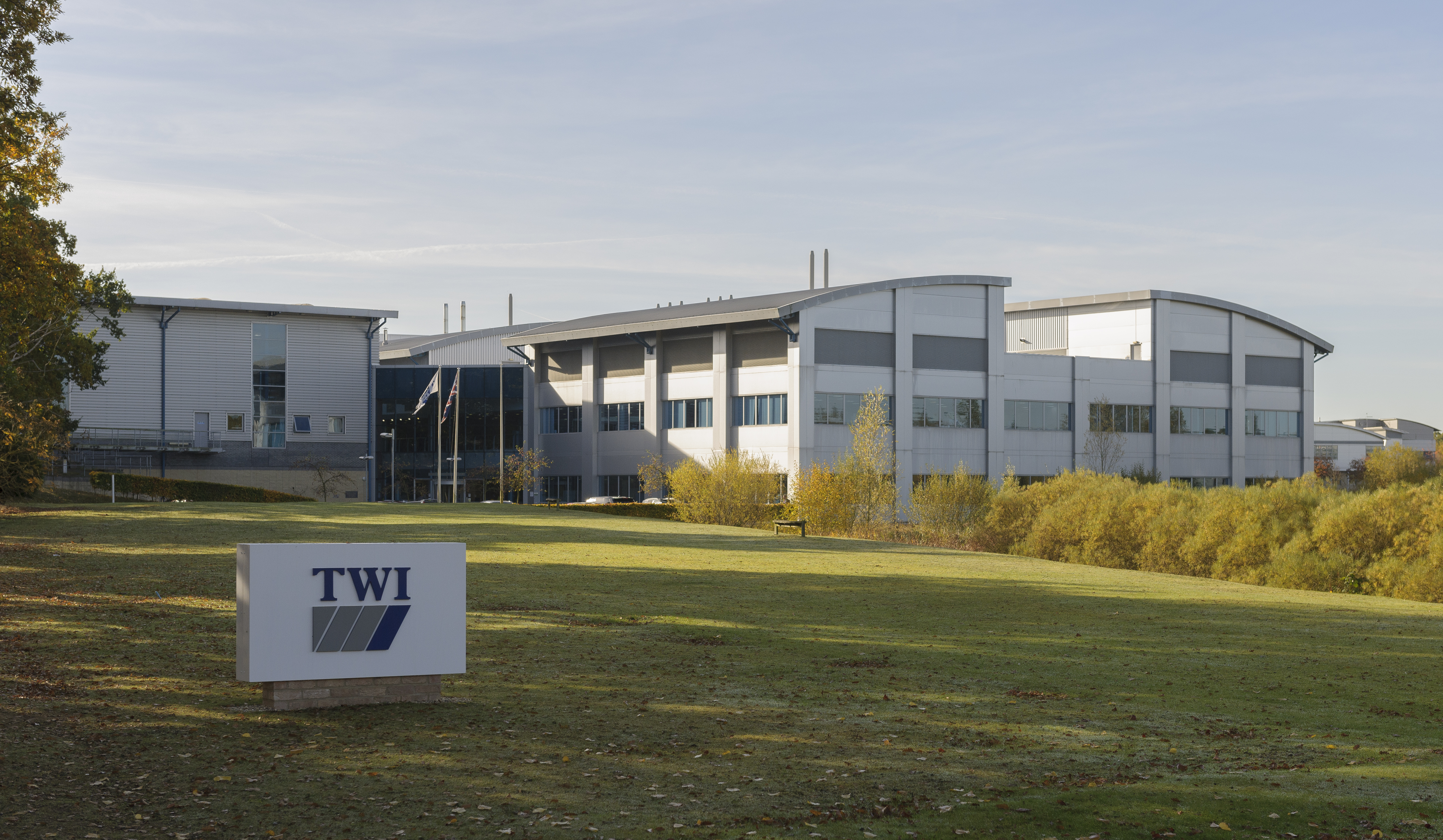
- TWI Ltd (The Welding Institute) on Granta Park near Cambridge UK
- Abbreviation: TWI
- Formation: 28 March 1968
- Type: Research Association/Institute
- Legal status: Private Company
- Purpose: Welding Research
- Headquarters: Granta Park, Great Abington, Cambridge, UK
- Location: Granta Park, Great Abington, Cambridge, CB21 6AL
- Region served: Worldwide
- Members: Welding Engineers
- Affiliations: Engineering Council, International Institute of Welding
- Website: TWI

The Welding Institute (TWI) is a British research organisation that studies welding and related engineering technologies, based near Cambridge, UK. It was originally registered as the Institution of Welding Engineers in 1923.

TWI services include consultancy, technical advice, research and investigation for industrial member companies and public funding bodies. It also offers training and examination services in NDT, welding and inspection across the globe.

The Welding Institute Group now encompasses a professional membership institution (‘The Welding Institute’) and an engineering research, consultancy and technology organisation (‘TWI Ltd’), as well as an international training school (‘TWI Training’), the National Structural Integrity Research Centre (‘NSIRC’), a series of collaborative enterprises with academia (‘The TWI Innovation Network’), and more.

== TWI Ltd ==
Descended from the British Welding Research Association (BWRA), TWI Ltd is now a global independent research and technology organisation.

As a membership-based organisation, TWI Ltd works across all industry sectors and in all aspects of manufacturing, fabrication and whole-life integrity management technologies, where it provides services such as consultancy, technical advice, research and investigation for industrial member companies and public funding bodies.

TWI Ltd provides engineering research, consultancy and technical services in welding, joining, materials, inspection and structural integrity. Its work includes research and development, knowledge transfer, technical investigation, and the assessment and management of engineering assets throughout their service life.

TWI's R&D work has delivered a number inventions and developments to industry, including advancing MIG and TIG welding, creating CTOD and methods of understanding of brittle fracture, fatigue design SN curves, linear friction and friction stir welding, local vacuum electron beam welding, and many more.

Along with wider research programmes, TWI Ltd works directly with industrial member companies through single client projects to provide bespoke solutions. Much of the work is confidential, with the outcomes and associated intellectual property owned exclusively by the client.

Through TWI Training, it also offers training and examination services in NDT, welding and inspection across the globe.

== The Welding Institute ==
While TWI Ltd works for its industrial member companies, The Welding Institute has a separate membership of around 4,500 individual professionals, who receive range of support in their careers and professional development.

The Welding Institute is a professional engineering institution established in 1923 to support the development of engineering professionals in the fields of welding, joining and allied technologies.

The Welding Institute is a membership organisation as well as being a licensed member of the Engineering Council, which allows them to assess and nominate eligible members to become registered as a Chartered Engineer (CEng), Incorporated Engineer (IEng) or Engineering Technician (EngTech).

The Institute also provides guidance to statutory bodies such as the British Standards Institution, the Engineering Council, and the UK government.

== Structure ==
The professional division of the organisation (The Welding Institute) is a licensed member of the Engineering Council. It is situated at Granta Park, near Duxford Museum.

Both industrial and professional members are represented on the Council that oversees TWI's business and operational activities.

=== UK and overseas operations ===
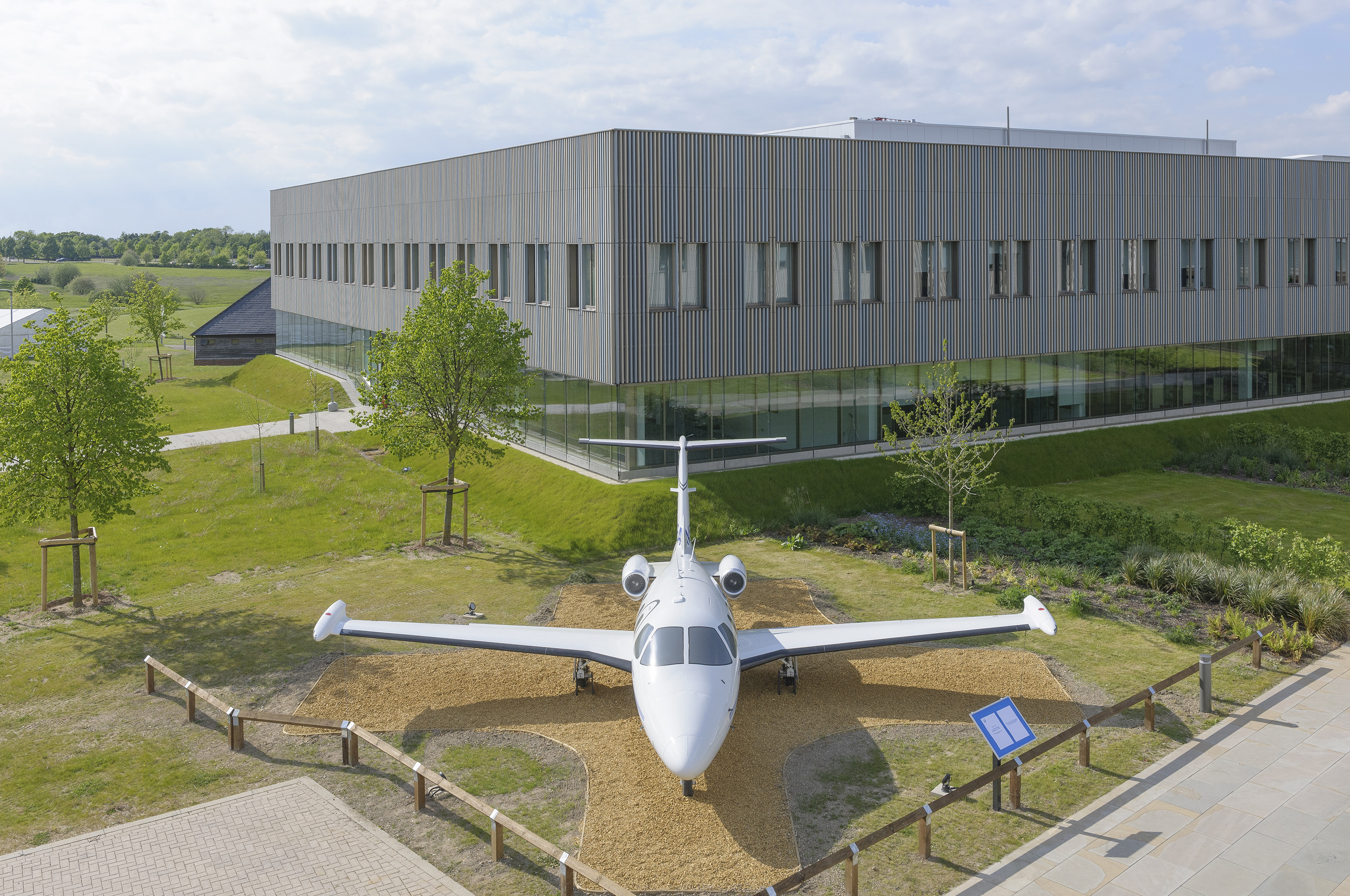
Friction stir welded Eclipse 500 at TWI's headquarters at Granta Park

TWI has several facilities both in the UK and overseas:

- TWI headquarters at Granta Park, Cambridgeshire
- TWI Technology Centre (North East), set up in 1992 in north-west Middlesbrough.
- TWI Technology Centre (Yorkshire), on the Waverley Business Park in Catcliffe.
- TWI NDT Validation Centre (Wales), at Harbourside Business Park, Port Talbot, in south Wales

The organisation has international branches in Australia, Bahrain, Canada, India, Indonesia, Malaysia, Thailand, Turkey, and the United Arab Emirates.

== History ==
=== Earlier institution ===
The Welding Institute (TWI Professional Group) is a direct descendant of the Institution of Welding Engineers Limited, which began when 20 men gathered on 26 January 1922 in the Holborn Restaurant in London and resolved to establish an association to bring together acetylene welders and those interested in electric arc welding. The date of registration under the Companies Act was 15 February 1923. Slow growth over the next ten years saw membership grow to 600 with an income of £800 per annum.

=== Formation ===
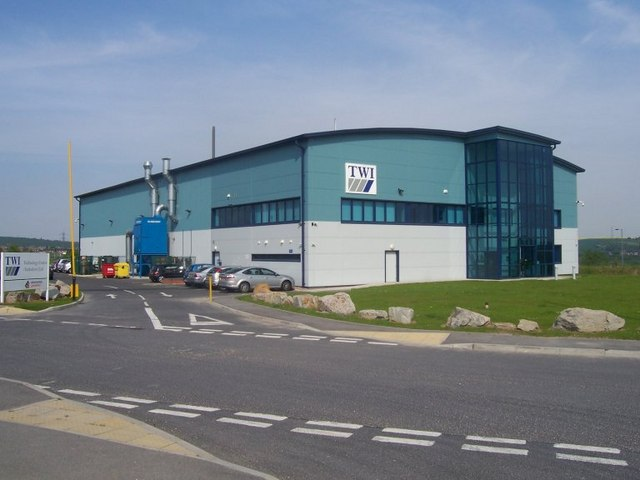
TWI Technology Centre at Catcliffe

In April 1934, the Institution merged with the British Advisory Welding Council to form a new organisation – the Institute of Welding.

This was important to the later creation of TWI Ltd as it took the scope of the Institute beyond personal professional membership to also include industrial member companies in order to further support research activities.

A symposium that same year, Welding of Iron and Steel, held in conjunction with the Iron and Steel Institute, showed the need for a research programme. It took the threat of war, the Welding Research Council and modest funding from the Department of Scientific and Industrial Research (DSIR), to generate the will and ability to commence such a programme in 1937. The Institute had no laboratories of its own and supported work, mainly in UK universities.

=== Research association ===
In the late 1940s, a move was made to transform the Welding Research Council to the recently established status of Research Association, thereby giving it access to DSIR funding in proportion to that raised from industry. At the time, professional institutions were debarred from acting as Research Associations The debarring of professional institutions from acting as research associations forced the two arms of the Institute to split in 1946, leading to the creation of the British Welding Research Association (BWRA) as a separate entity to The Institute of Welding.

=== Cambridgeshire ===
In 1946 the BWRA bought Abington Hall, near Cambridge, UK, a country house and grounds in poor repair, for £3850 and commenced business under Allan Ramsay Moon as its director of research. The first welding shop was established in stables adjoining the house, and fatigue research commenced under Dr. Richard Weck.

BWRA also occupied a house in London, 29 Park Crescent, which it converted into a metallurgical laboratory, with the butler's pantry becoming the polishing room and the coachman's quarters, the machine shop.

Ramsay Moon left after one year, disillusioned at the grant of only £30,000 from DSIR, and it fell to Dr. Harry Taylor to grow the organisation into a viable business.

In 1948, The Welding Institute celebrated its silver jubilee with the award of a Grant of Arms by the College of Arms. The coat of arms depicts a joint being made through the application of heat with a Latin motto that translates as ‘out of two, one.’

=== Academic programmes ===
Meanwhile, The Institute of Welding had bought property in London very close to the Imperial College of Science and Technology. It ran an expanding training programme through its School of Welding Technology and later the School of Non-Destructive Testing in what is a clear forerunner to today's TWI Training.

The first course, on the welding of pressure vessels, saw nearly 100 applicants for the 40 places, demonstrating a need for such courses.

=== Merger ===
In 1957, Richard Weck, became Director of BWRA. The 1960s saw significant growth in the size and scope of BWRA, including its involvement in training. In general, these activities complemented those of the Institute of Welding but it became apparent that the two organisations would serve industry better by merging. The scessor to DSIR, the Ministry of Technology, put forward no objection so a merger was agreed and a new body – The Welding Institute – was created on 28 March 1968.

These earliest years were the foundation of The Welding Institute and what would later become TWI Ltd.

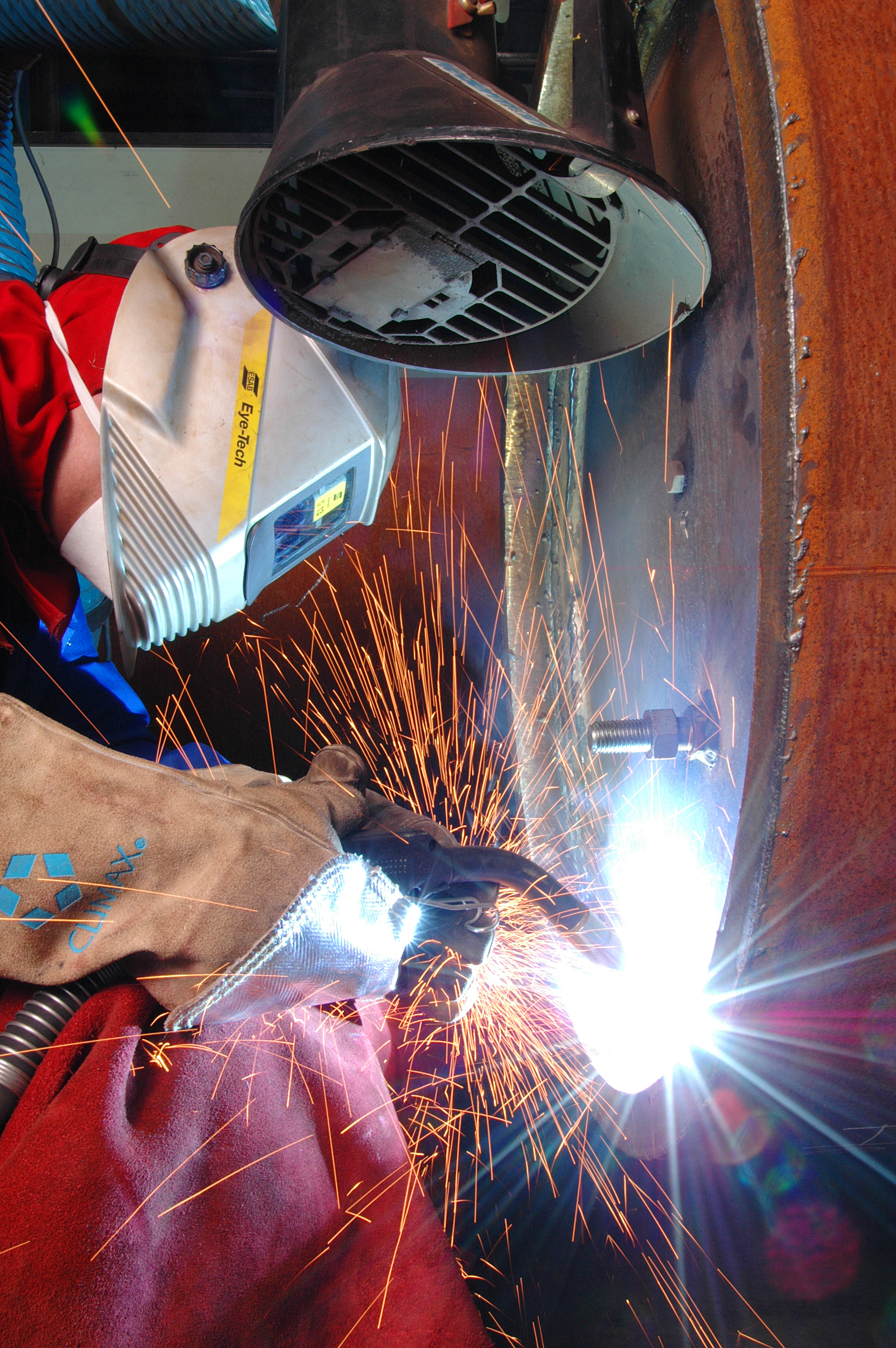
Gas metal arc welding

=== Withdrawal of Government funds ===
Direct support from Government departments ceased in the 1970s, but TWI not only survived this funding crisis but grew rapidly. The original individual professional membership envisaged in 1922 developed into a body of more than 7000 engineers.

=== Expansion worldwide ===
In 1988 Bevan Braithwaite was appointed as chief executive of The Welding Institute. By 2008, the organisation had opened offices and laboratories at three further sites within the UK (in Middlesbrough, Port Talbot and the Advanced Manufacturing Park, South Yorkshire) and operated facilities in the North America, China, Southeast Asia, India and the Middle East.

In 2012, it launched the National Structural Integrity Research Centre (NSIRC) for postgraduate education.

By 2015, TWI had established a further UK base in Aberdeen and 12 international branches.

In 2016, TWI formed the Tipper Group, "a group designed especially for women in the engineering profession." It was created with the aim to support and inspire female engineers in welding, joining and associated technologies, but has since extended its remit to support wider diversity and inclusion within the profession and at TWI.

Caroline Gumble began her role as Chief Executive of The Welding Institute Group in July, 2025.

== See also ==
- International Institute of Welding
