= AVIC Manufacturing Technology Institute =

- Founded: May 1957
- Type: Comprehensive research institute
- Purpose: Aeronautical manufacturing technologies, materials and equipments
- Location: Chaoyang District, Beijing, China
- Origins: Ninth Research Institute of the Second Ministry of Machinery Industry
- Region served: China
- Members: 800+
- Parent organization: Aviation Industry Corporation of China (AVIC)
- Website: www.avicmti.avic.com/enweb/index.shtml

The AVIC Manufacturing Technology Institute (simplified Chinese: 中国航空制造技术研究院; traditional Chinese: 中國航空製造技術研究院; pinyin: Zhōngguó Hángkōng Zhìzào Jìshù Yánjiūyuàn) is a comprehensive research institute in the field of aeronautical manufacturing technologies, materials and equipments in China. It was established in 1957 and is a subsidiary of the Aviation Industry Corporation of China (AVIC). AS of 2018, it has more than 800 individual members. The current president is Li Zhiqiang.

== History ==
The AVIC Manufacturing Technology Institute traces its origins to the former "Ninth Research Institute of the Second Ministry of Machinery Industry" (第二机械工业部第九研究所), founded in 1957 and would later become the Beijing Aeronautical Manufacturing Technology Research Institute (BAMTRI) (北京航空制造工程研究所). In December 2016, it was renamed "AVIC Manufacturing Technology Institute", which has been used to date.

== Organizations ==
- Beijing Precision Engineering Institute for Aircraft Industry
- Jinan Special Structure Research Institute
- State Key Laboratory of High Energy Beam Processing Technology
- National Defense Science and Technology Industry Special Welding Innovation Center
- International Joint Research Center for Basic Research of Advanced Aviation Manufacturing Technology
- Beijing Key Laboratory of Complex Component Numerical Control Processing Technology and Equipment
- Beijing Key Laboratory of High Energy Beam Incremental Manufacturing Technology and Equipment
- Beijing Key Laboratory of Digital Plastic Forming Technology and Equipment
- Beijing Friction Welding Technology and Equipment Engineering Technology Research Center
- Beijing International Science and Technology Cooperation Base of Aviation Manufacturing Technology and High-end Special Equipment
- Aviation Science and Technology Key Laboratory of Aviation Welding and Connection Technology
- Aviation Science and Technology Key Laboratory of Digital Manufacturing Technology
- Aviation Science and Technology Key Laboratory of Plastic Forming Technology
- Aviation Science and Technology Key Laboratory of Additive Manufacturing
- Aviation Science and Technology Key Laboratory of Precision Manufacturing Technology
- Aviation Science and Technology Key Laboratory of High Performance Electromagnetic Window
- China Aviation Industry Manufacturing Technology Center
- Research and Development Center of Aviation Special Equipment for Aviation Industry
- Laser Weapon Technology Center of Aviation Industry
- Aviation Industry Intelligent Manufacturing Innovation Center
- AVIC High Tech Co., Ltd.

== Scientific publishing ==
- Aeronautical Manufacturing Technology, founded in 1958
