= River Granta =

Two tributaries of the River Cam, England

Coordinates: 52°21′N 0°16′E

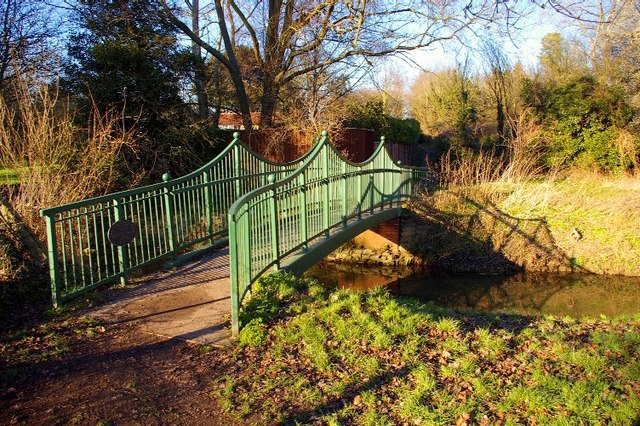
The Millennium Bridge over the river Granta connecting Little and Great Abington

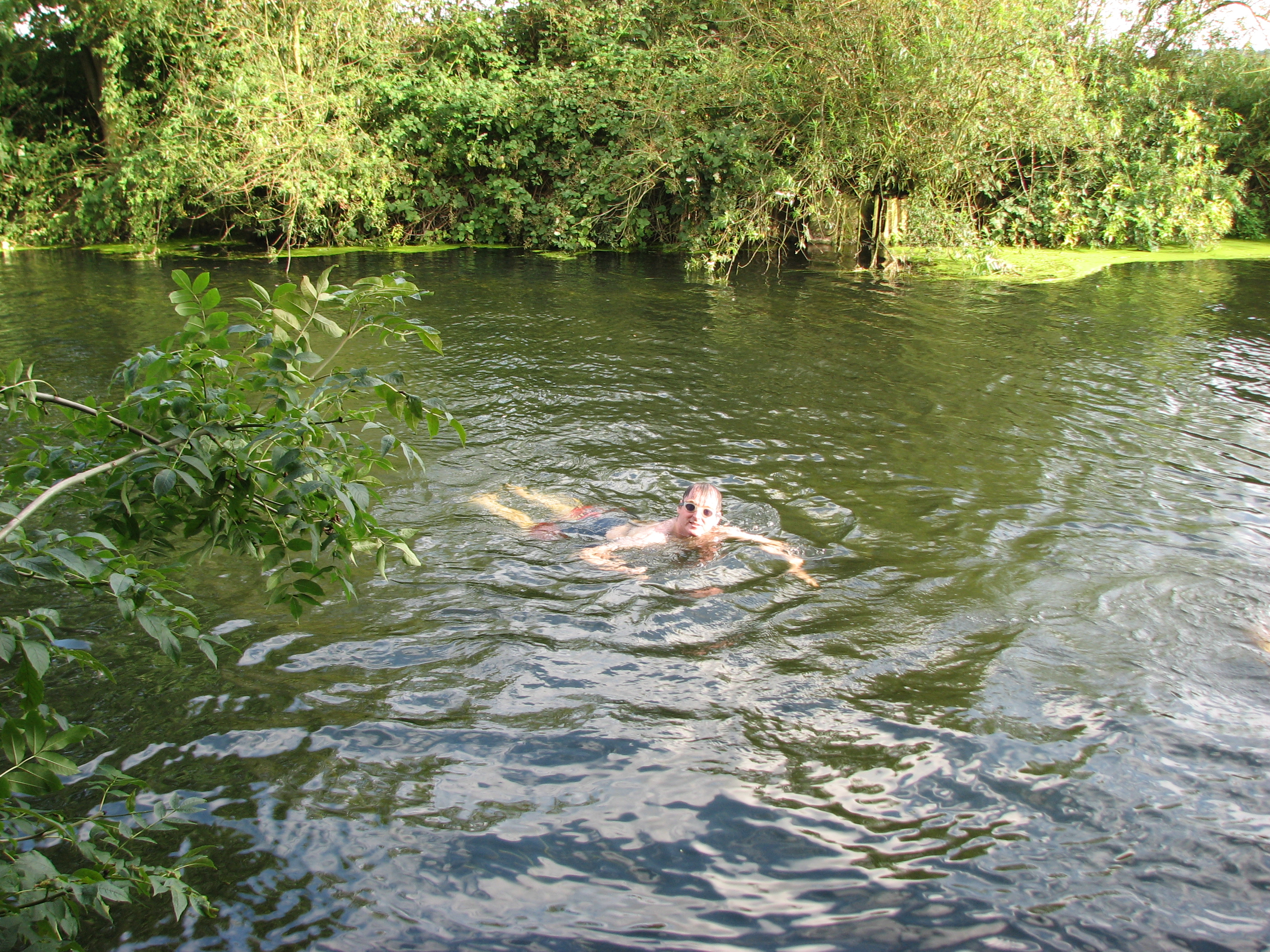
Swimming in the River Granta near Grantchester Meadows

The River Granta is the name of a small tributary of the River Cam, but it is also an alternative name for the upper course of the Cam. The Granta runs 10 mi (16 km) from south of Haverhill to join the Cam (or Granta) south of Great Shelford.

In many maps the river changes its name at the Silver Street Bridge in Cambridge and is called "Granta" above and "Cam" below it.

In earlier times even the lower part of the Cam was named the Granta, but after the name of the Anglo-Saxon town of Grantebrycge had been modified to Cambridge, the river was renamed to match.The word Granta has a pre-English, Celtic origin. It is a very ancient river name (a hydronym) dating back to the Brittonic period.

The Etymology of Granta, Root Meaning: While the precise etymology is still debated by language scholars, it is widely believed to stem from a Proto-Celtic or Brittonic root that likely meant "muddy waters" or "shallow river." Some historical records link it to an early Brythonic settlement called Cair Grauth.

Earliest Records: The name stabilized well before the mid-eighth century. It famously appears in the Anglo-Saxon Chronicle in the year 875 to describe a town called Grantebrycge, which literally translates to "bridge over the Granta".

The name of Grantchester is associated with the ancient meaning of "Granta", whereas Granta Park is on the banks of the small Granta.

The literary magazine Granta, founded in 1889 by students at Cambridge University as The Granta, is named after the river.

== See also ==
- River Cam

== Literature ==
- Franz X. Bogner & Stephen P. Tomkins: The Cam. An Aerial Portrait of the Cambridge River. Laber Foundation, 2015. ISBN 978-0-9932642-0-7 (http://www.cambridgeriver.info/).

== Links ==
- geograph – River Granta at Shelford
