= Granta Park =

Science, technology, and biomedical park near Cambridge, England

Coordinates: 52.11740°N 0.22322°E

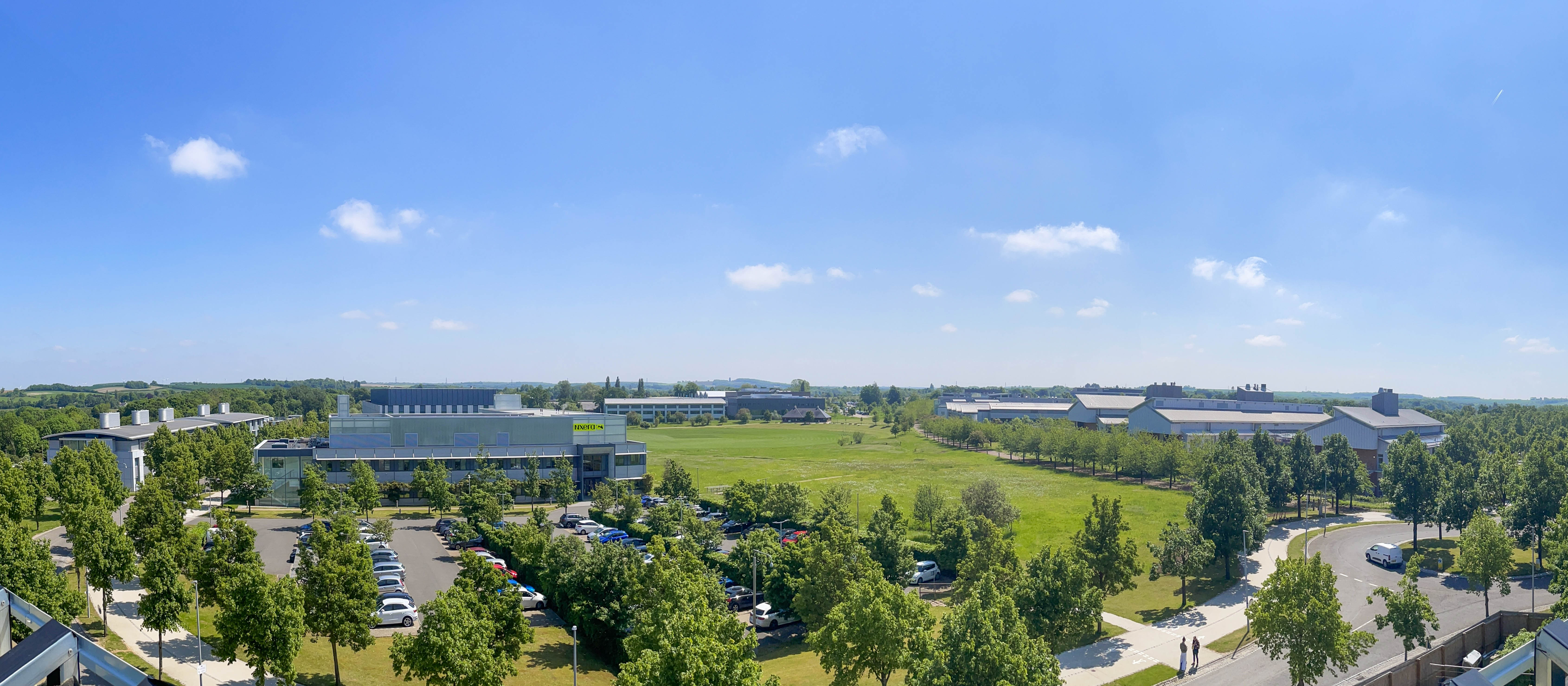
A view of Granta Park in Spring 2024

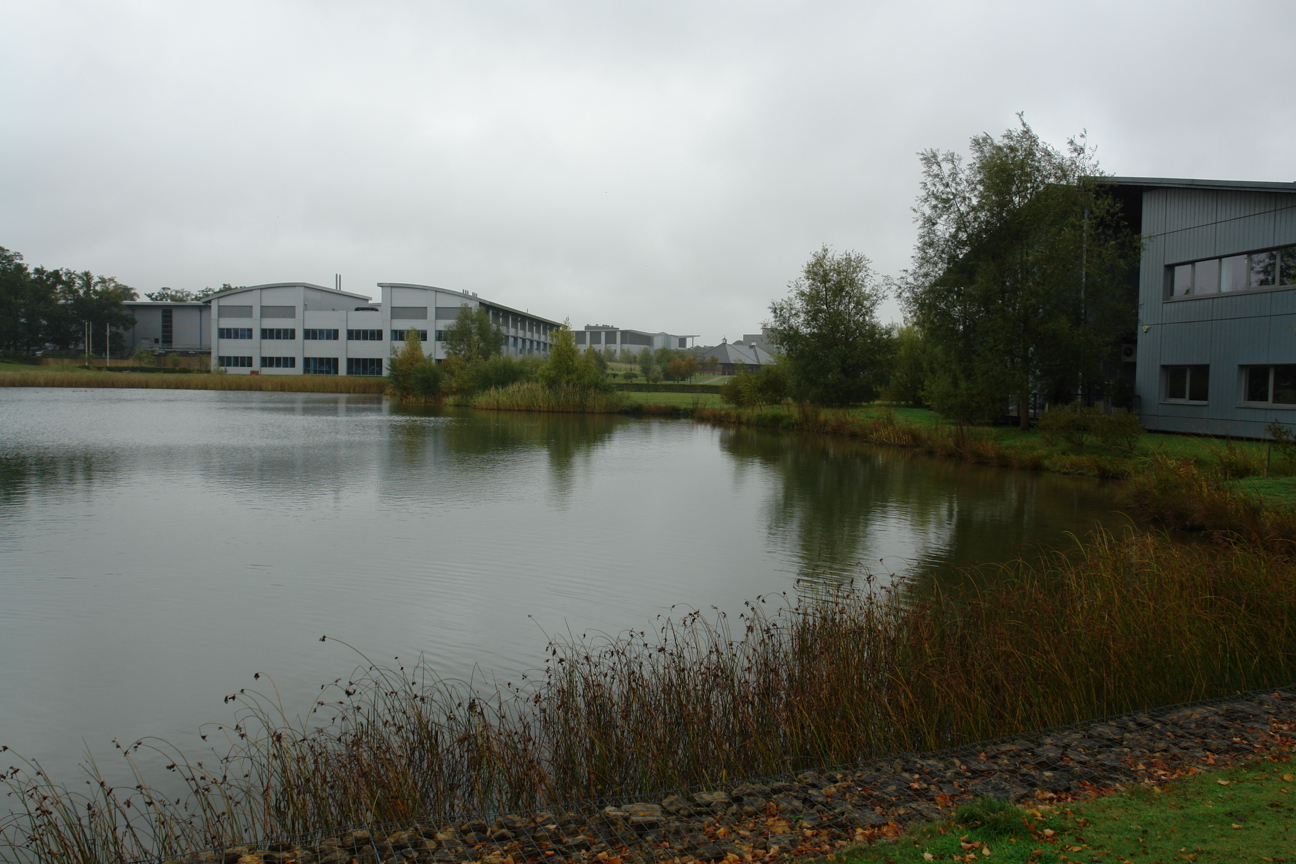
The Welding Institute on Granta Park near Cambridge UK

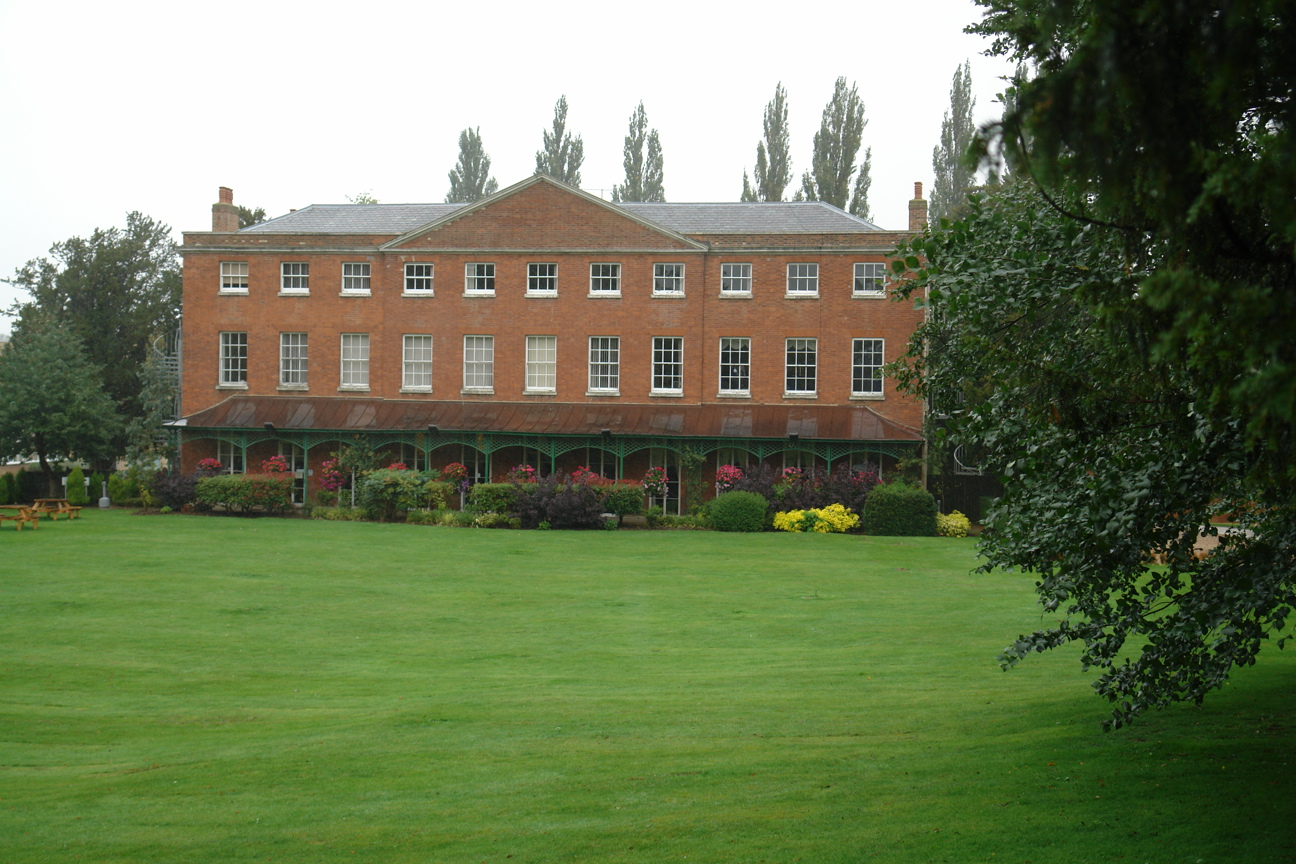
Abington Hall on Granta Park contains rooms of TWI's training school and Plant Integrity Ltd.

Granta Park is a science, technology and biopharmaceutical park based on the bank of the River Granta in Great Abington near Cambridge, England.

The idea for the park came from the chief executive of The Welding Institute (TWI Ltd) Bevan Braithwaite OBE. He started negotiations in 1992 for an option to buy the 87 acres of farm land, on which Granta Park is now built, and obtained the planning permission from South Cambridgeshire District Council, which laid down the basic concept for a high quality, low density, fully landscaped development. A design team comprising Latz+Partner, a leading German landscape design company and Eric Parry Architects developed the master plan for the park in consideration of ecological criteria with the aim of preserving and enhancing the existing rural landscape and ensuring the site would be easily accessible. A joint partnership was formed between TWI Ltd and MEPC plc, and Granta Park Ltd was created. MEPC, who at that time had already made a success of Milton Park in Abingdon, Oxfordshire, supported TWI professionally to turn Bevan Braithwaite's vision of a new Cambridge science and technology park into reality.

The new park began to take shape at Great Abington following a groundbreaking ceremony held at the end of 1997. Bevan Braithwaite, the Chief Executive of TWI Ltd, teamed-up with Councillor Shirley Saunders, Chairman of South Cambridgeshire District Council, and Gavin Davidson of MEPC plc to launch the building of a cluster of modern R&D facilities. Most of the key infrastructure was completed by summer 1998 with the development programme of the first Phase taking 5–7 years. Set around a cricket pitch and overlooking a new lake in the wooded grounds adjacent to Abington Hall, the buildings contain research facilities and business accommodation for several thousand staff.

Granta Park provides not only new facilities for The Welding Institute's extensive R&D laboratories but also fulfils a need for purpose-built locations for the area's expanding biotech and technology sector. The following companies and other organisations are located there:

- Accelonix
- Altos
- Bicycle
- Alzheimer's Research UK
- Certis
- Colonix Medical
- Gilead
- Illumina
- Infomedia
- Inivata
- Intergence
- ista
- Jagex
- Keronite
- Lonza
- Lycotec
- Mary's Ltd
- MedImmune
- Nxera
- OneNucleus
- Origin Sciences
- Pfizer
- PPD
- Sphere Fluidics
- TWI Ltd
- Vernalis Research

== Extension ==
TWI finished the construction of three large new buildings by the end of 2014. One of these is the Granta Centre, used as a conference centre.
