= International Institute of Welding =

International scientific and engineering body

The International Institute of Welding (IIW) is an international scientific and engineering body for welding, brazing and related technologies. Its membership consists of the national welding societies from around the world. The Institute was founded in 1948 by 13 national societies. By 2011 its membership has expanded to 55 national welding societies.

== Organization ==
The general assembly of the national societies defines the policy of the institute and elects its president and a board of directors. A permanent secretariat deals with regular day-to-day activities and maintains contact with other international bodies.

The institute has established a number of technical commissions, each one covering a relatively broad subject of welding science and technology. Under some of them there exist a number of technical sub-commissions, each one involved in a more specific aspect. The IIW participates in International Organization for Standardization (IOS) standardization activities in Technical Committee TC44 (welding and allied processes). A total of 21 ISO standards and updates have been published under the direct responsibility of IIW.

== Authorised bodies and governance ==
IIW operates a structured quality and governance system to ensure that education, training, qualification, and certification activities in welding engineering are harmonised across its global network. This system is based on common rules and procedures, the conformity of which is verified on a regular basis through peer assessment and oversight mechanisms established by IIW.

In 2000, European Federation for Welding, Joining and Cutting (EWF) licensed its qualification system to the IIW. Since then, a combined EWF/IIW qualification and certification system has been implemented worldwide. Under this harmonised system, all IIW Authorised Nominated Bodies (ANBs) also operate as EWF ANBs within their respective scopes of authorisation.

Within this framework, authorisation activities are managed by the International Authorisation Board (IAB). The IAB is responsible for approving and supervising organisations that deliver IIW education, training, qualification, and certification services. This is operated jointly with the EWF. These organisations are formally designated as Authorised Nominated Bodies (ANBs) and operate within a defined scope of authorisation.

Each ANB is authorised to administer examinations, assess candidates, and issue IIW diplomas and certificates for specific qualification levels. In addition, ANBs are responsible for approving, monitoring, and supervising Approved Training Bodies (ATBs) that provide training courses leading to IIW qualifications. The scope of authorisation of an ANB specifies both the qualifications it is permitted to offer and the geographical territory in which it may operate. While ANBs are nominated by IIW member societies in a specific country, some ANBs are authorised to operate in more than one country or region.

Approved Training Bodies (ATBs) deliver the education and training required for IIW diplomas under the supervision of the relevant ANB. Specific requirements apply to ATBs with regard to trainer competence, training facilities and equipment, quality management systems, and compliance with the prescribed training syllabuses. This multi-level structure supports consistency and mutual recognition of welding engineering qualifications across different countries and industrial sectors.

IIW Authorised Nominated Bodies
Country	ANB	Website	Chief Executive
Australia	Weld Australia	https://www.weldaustralia.com.au	Luke Nicholls
Austria	Schweisstechnische Zentralanstalt (SZA)	http://www.sza.at	Katharina Umlaub
Belgium	Association Belge du Soudage / Belgische Vereniging voor Lastechniek	http://www.bvl-abs.be	Frank Duponcheel
Bulgaria	Bulgarian Welding Society	http://bws-bg.org/en/	Stanislav Nikolov
Canada	Canadian Welding Bureau (CWB)	https://www.cwbgroup.org	Inderpal Jaswal
China	Chinese Authorised Nominated Body for Companies Certification (CANBCC)	http://www.iiw-canb.org	Yinglong Xie
Croatia	Hrvatsko Društvo za Tehniku Zavarivanja	http://www.hdtz-cws.com/	Slobodan Kralj
Czech Republic	Czech Welding Society ANB	http://www.cws-anb.cz	Václav Minařík
Denmark	FORCE Technology	http://www.force-cert.dk	Niels Ovesen
Finland	Suomen Hitsausteknillinen Yhdistys	http://www.shy.fi	Juha Kauppila
France	Association Française du Soudage	http://www.afs-asso.org	Philippe Lebeau
Germany	DVS PersZert	http://www.dvs-ev.de	Martin Lehmann
Greece	Welding Greek Institute	https://www.wgi.gr/	Georgia Kolyva
Hungary	Hungarian Association of Welding Technology and Material Testing	http://www.mhte.hu	László Gyura
India	The Indian Institute of Welding	http://www.iiwindia.com/	Mahadev Shome
Indonesia	Indonesian Welding Society (IWS)	http://www.api-iws.org	Edi Diarman Djasman
Italy	IIS CERT srl	https://www.iis.it/	Emanuele Gandolfo
Japan	Japan Welding Engineering Society (JWES)	https://www.jwes.or.jp/en/	Wataru Mizunuma
Kazakhstan	Kazakhstan Welding Association (Kazweld)	http://kazweld.kz/en	Rustambek Abdurakhmanov
Malaysia	Welding Institute of Malaysia	https://www.wim.org.my	Desmond Yeap
Netherlands	Nederlands Instituut voor Lastechniek	http://www.nil.nl	Tim Liefaart
Nigeria	Nigerian Institute of Welding	https://www.niw.ng/	John Miller
Norway	Norwegian Welding Association	http://www.sveis.no	Bjørnar Værnes
Poland	Łukasiewicz – Górnośląski Instytut Technologiczny – Centrum Spawalnictwa	http://www.is.lukasiewicz.gov.pl	Michał Kubica
Portugal	Instituto de Soldadura e Qualidade (ISQ)	http://www.isq.pt	Anabela Costa
Republic of Korea	Korean Welding and Joining Society	http://www.kwjs.or.kr/	Young Whan Park
Romania	ASR Cert Pers	https://asr.ro/	Horia Dascău
Serbia	DUZS-CertPers	http://www.duzs.org.rs	Vencislav Grabulov
Singapore	Singapore Welding Society	http://www.sws.org.sg/	Perianan Radhakrishnan
Slovakia	Výskumný ústav zváracský	http://www.vuz.sk	Peter Durik
Slovenia	Slovensko Društvo za Varilno Tehniko	http://www.drustvo-sdvt.si	Miro Uran
South Africa	Southern African Institute of Welding (SAIW)	http://www.saiw.co.za/	Elijah Banda
Spain	Asociación Española de Soldadura y Tecnologías de Unión (CESOL)	http://www.cesol.es	Juan Vicente Rosell
Sweden	Svetskommissionen	http://www.svets.se	Elisabeth Öhman
Switzerland	Schweizerischer Verein für Schweisstechnik	https://www.svs.ch/	Daniela Grütter
Thailand	Welding Institute of Thailand	http://wit.kmutnb.ac.th/	Panarit Sethakul
Türkiye	TR-ANB by Gedik Education and Social Assistance Foundation & Turkish Welding Technologies Academy	https://tr-anb.org	Emre Tuğberk Gülnergiz
Ukraine	Paton Welding Institute Training and Qualification Centre	http://muac.kpi.ua/	Yevgenia Chvertko
United Kingdom	TWI Certification Ltd.	https://www.twicertification.com/	Emma Freckingham
Vietnam	Vietnam–German Technology Transfer Center	http://hwc.com.vn	Lê Khánh Tường

== Publications ==
The Institute publishes Welding in the World, a bimonthly international scientific, technical and trade journal.

== See also ==
- European Federation for Welding, Joining and Cutting (EWF)
- American Welding Society
- Canadian Welding Bureau
