= Welding inspection =

Quality control process in welding

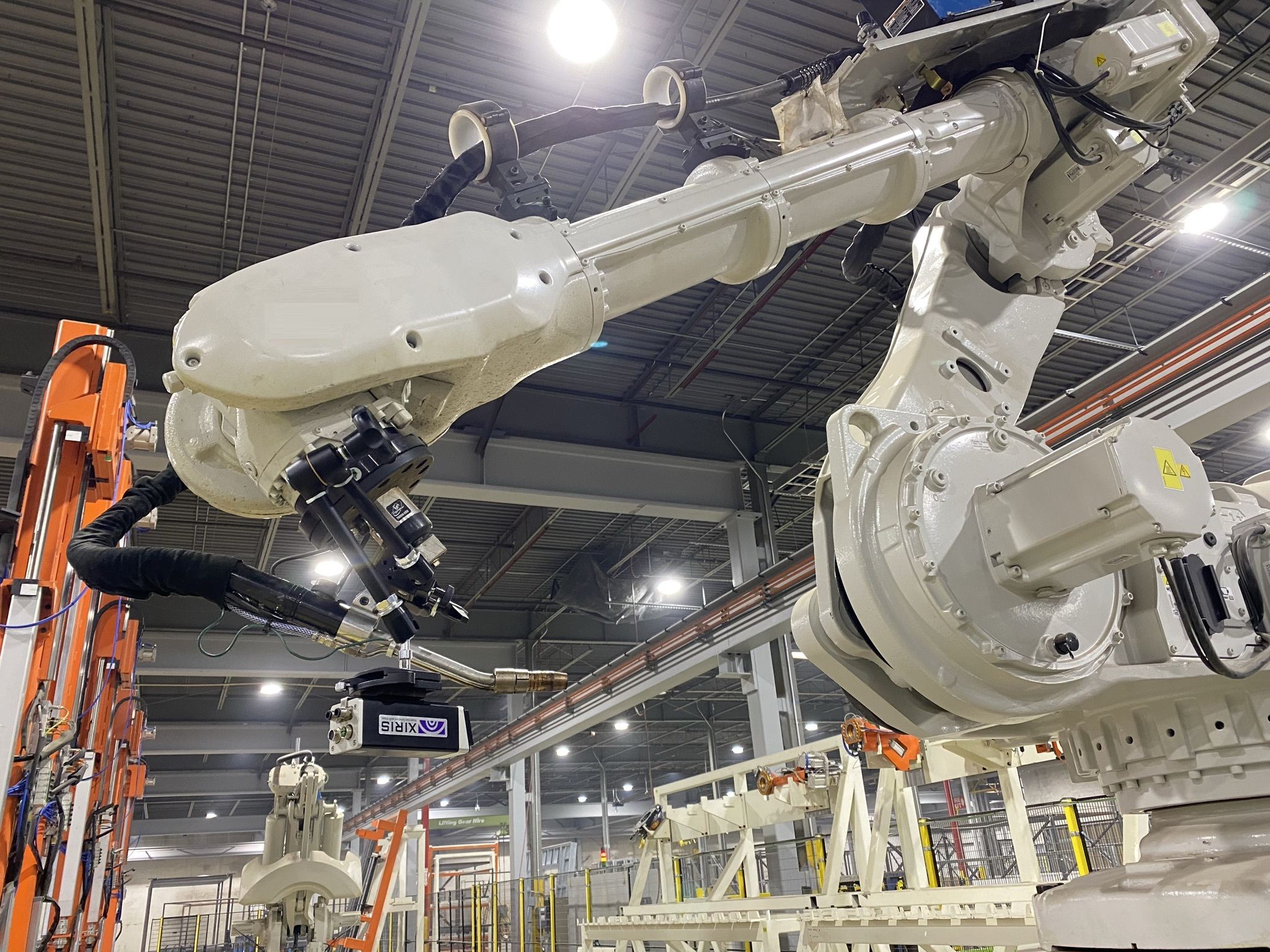
A state-of-the-art robotic weld system in a modern industrial setting, where robotic arms execute precise welds on metallic components. The weld monitoring system, equipped with a high-definition weld camera, captures detailed images of the weld pool and arc in real time, framed by machinery, safety barriers, and organized workflows.

Welding inspection is a critical process that ensures the safety and integrity of welded structures used in key industries, including transportation, aerospace, construction, and oil and gas. These industries often operate in high-stress environments where any compromise in structural integrity can result in severe consequences, such as leaks, cracks or catastrophic failure. The practice of welding inspection involves evaluating the welding process and the resulting weld joint to ensure compliance with established standards of safety and quality. Modern solutions, such as the weld inspection system and digital welding cameras, are increasingly employed to enhance defect detection and ensure weld reliability in demanding applications.

Industry-wide welding inspection methods are categorized into Non-Destructive Testing (NDT) including Visual Inspection; and Destructive Testing. Fabricators typically prefer Non-Destructive Testing (NDT) methods to evaluate the structural integrity of a weld, as these techniques do not cause component or structural damage. In welding, NDT includes mechanical tests to assess parameters such as size, shape, alignment, and the absence of welding defects. Visual Inspection, a widely used technique for quality control, data acquisition, and data analysis is one of the most common welding inspection methods. In contrast, Destructive testing methods involve physically breaking or cutting a weld to evaluate its quality. Common destructive testing techniques include tensile testing, bend testing, and impact testing. These methods are typically performed on sample welds to validate the overall welding process. Machine Vision software, integrated with advanced inspection tools, has significantly enhanced defect detection and improved the efficiency of the welding process.

== History ==
The evolution of welding technology has been driven by advancements in Weld quality assurance, welding codes, and standards for welding inspection. While the origins of welding can be traced back to approximately 3000 B.C., the need for effective weld joint inspection became increasingly apparent during the late 19th and early 20th centuries, coinciding with the rise of industrialization and the growing demand for reliable structural integrity in manufactured goods.

Early welding inspection methods were limited, relying primarily on visual inspection techniques. The advent of more intricate welding techniques, such as Arc Welding in the 1880s, highlighted the need for stricter quality control procedures. As the industrial sector grew, particularly during World War II, Advanced Non-Destructive Testing (NDT) techniques were developed. Methods such as radiography and ultrasonic testing allowed welding inspectors to evaluate the weld quality without causing damage to the materials.

By the mid-20th century, organizations began training their workforce in the protocols of welding codes, standards, and inspection procedures. To support the broader international framework for welding quality assurance, the Canadian Welding Bureau (CWB), established in 1947, played a key role in developing certification criteria for welding operations and inspections in Canada. Similarly, global standards organizations, such as the International Organization for Standardization (ISO) and the American Welding Society (AWS), introduced guidelines and rules that enhanced inspection criteria and techniques.

A significant milestone in welding inspection occurred in the 1970s with the introduction of in-process monitoring. This innovation allowed inspectors to analyze the welding process in real-time and identify flaws as they occurred, reducing the likelihood of welding defects reaching final inspection. Advances in machine vision software, optics, and laser technologies further enabled consistent and precise weld bead inspections, significantly enhancing the reliability of welded connections. Today, welding inspection is an integral part of quality control across various industries. The field continues to evolve, with modern technologies such as Artificial Intelligence and Machine Learning driving advancements in defect detection and operational efficiency. The ongoing adoption and refinement of welding inspection methods demonstrate the industry's commitment to quality, dependability, and safety in welding processes.

== Methods ==
Welding inspection is a comprehensive process comprising multiple steps and elements to evaluate the integrity of a weld joint.[i] Effective weld inspection is typically conducted in three phases: pre-weld, during-weld, and post-weld. Each phase utilizes inspection methods, such as automatic non-contact inspection with Machine Vision, Non-Destructive Testing (NDT), and destructive testing techniques. These methods are instrumental in detecting weld defects, ensuring robust quality management, and preventing structural failures.

=== Pre-Weld Inspection ===
Pre-weld inspection focuses on preparing the parent material for the welding procedure and ensuring that all necessary conditions are met to achieve a high-quality weld. This stage ensures that joints, material inputs, and equipment are suitable for the welding task at hand, thereby mitigating the likelihood for defects from the outset.

Inspection during this phase involves monitoring the seam preparation, the alignment of the welding torch relative to the seam, and the shape of the welding arc. These aspects of the welding environment must be carefully controlled to verify proper control, otherwise, defects such as contamination, cracks, or porosity may arise. Additionally, welding materials, including electrodes and filler metals, must be inspected to confirm compliance with process standards. Visual Inspection can be performed manually by an operator or through automatic inspection processes using Machine Vision systems. Pre-weld Non-Destructive Testing, such as ultrasonic or radiographic testing, may be employed to detect pre-existing defects in the base metal before welding begins. Furthermore, pre-weld inspection can include preparing samples for comparison in destructive testing.

=== During Weld Inspection ===
During the welding process, inspection plays a crucial role in real-time monitoring, enabling operators to make immediate adjustments to process parameters and prevent weld defects. Monitoring critical aspects such as melt pool size and shape, wire feed, weld arc, and bead formation is essential to ensure precise alignment, uniformity, and penetration. Any indications of weld spatter, undercutting, or incomplete fusion can be promptly rectified, reducing the need for rework.

Non-destructive inspection or in-process monitoring during welding is achieved using infrared sensors and welding cameras, which provide real-time data collection on critical parameters like bead geometry, heat input, and arc stability. Weld camera monitoring systems are particularly beneficial in automated welding setups, where real-time adjustments can improve the uniformity and quality of the finished welds.

A well-designed weld camera system allows operators to remotely observe the welding process and detect faults as they occur. This capability facilitates the assessment of weld integrity and enable immediate adjustments to welding settings. By accurately measuring weld features, operators can identify subtle defects that may compromise weld quality standards. The integration of weld cameras with machine vision algorithms enhances precision in weld feature measurements and defect detection, enabling adaptive management of weld parameters crucial for critical applications.

=== Post-Weld Inspection ===
After the weld bead is formed, post-weld inspections are conducted to determine if the weld meets the desired quality standards and to identify surface or internal defects that could compromise the joint's integrity. Common issues detected during this phase include undercut, burn-through, and porosity. Welders or inspectors may also use measuring tools to visually assess the uniformity of the weld beads. While some defects may be visible on the surface, others may be hidden beneath the weld bead and remain undetected without specialized inspection methods. Post-Weld Non-Destructive Testing is employed to identify internal flaws without compromising the weld integrity. Primarily used NDT methods include:

==== Ultrasonic Testing (UT) ====
Ultrasonic testing (UT) uses high-frequency sound waves (ultrasound), beyond the range of human hearing, to evaluate the physical characteristics and geometry of metals. The technique relies on the propagation of sound waves at constant velocities through the material, with the transit time used to measure the distance traveled. Ultrasonic testing (UT) converts electrical energy into mechanical energy in the form of sound waves via a transducer. This method is commonly employed to detect internal flaws such as cracks and voids, particularly in thicker materials. Additionally, it provides valuable data on weld thickness and overall integrity.

==== Radiographic Testing (RT) ====
Radiography testing uses energy sources such as gamma-rays or X-rays to penetrate welded components, and create images that reveal irregular geometry beneath the surface. These images are examined by weld inspectors in a static mode to identify the source and extent of the fault. Modern radiography systems generate digital data, enabling efficient analysis as radiation passes through the welded area. Radiographic Testing can detect defects such as incomplete fusion and slag inclusions.

==== Magnetic Particle Inspection ====
Magnetic Particle Inspection is a non-destructive technique used to detect surface and near-surface defects in ferromagnetic materials, such as iron, nickel, and cobalt. The process involves magnetizing the material and applying iron particles on its surface; any surface imperfections disrupt the magnetic field, causing the particles to accumulate and reveal the fault. Magnetic Particle Testing is extensively used for inspecting castings, forgings, and weldments, making it indispensable in critical industries where it supports the safety and longevity of welded structures.

==== Liquid Penetrant Testing (PT) ====
Liquid Penetrant test is valued for its versatility and ease of use. It is effective on a wide range of materials, including metals (e.g., titanium, steel, aluminum), ceramics, glass, plastics, and rubber provided the surfaces are smooth and non-porous. Liquid Penetrant Testing is particularly suitable for detecting minor but critical surface flaws, making it an essential technique for ensuring reliable weld quality inspection.

==== Eddy Current Testing (ET) ====
Eddy Current Testing operates on the principle of electromagnetic induction, where an alternating current is applied to a coil, generating a magnetic field inside and around the coil. When an electrically conductive material is placed within this magnetic field, eddy currents are induced within the material. Eddy current instruments measured the inductive reactance and resistance of the workpiece. If a flaw is present in the tested material, the eddy currents are disrupted or altered, reducing the load on the coil and changing the system's impedance. Eddy Current Testing is particularly useful for identifying surface cracks, and discontinuities beneath the conductive materials.

=== Post-weld Destructive Testing ===
Destructive Weld Testing involves intentionally fracturing or segmenting a completed weld to evaluate material properties, strength, and quality. This procedure provides valuable insights into the structural integrity of the weld joint and the proficiency of the welder. Destructive welding is typically employed for welding procedure qualification, welder performance qualification, sampling inspection, and failure analysis. Common procedures in destructive testing include:

==== Tensile Testing ====
Tensile Testing evaluates the Tensile strength of a weld by subjecting the sample to axial tension until failure occurs. This test determines the weld's ability to endure stress and establishes its failure threshold. The width and thickness of the test sample are measured before testing to calculate its initial cross-sectional area. The sample is then subjected to tensile tension, with the load applied by testing equipment until it fractures. Tensile strength, expressed as stress in pounds per square inch, is calculated by dividing the breaking load by the sample's initial cross-sectional area. Welding standards typically mandate a tensile strength of at least 90% of the base metal's strength. The shear strength of fillet welds is calculated by dividing the maximum rupture load by the weld length subjected to stress, with results expressed in pounds per linear inch.

==== Bend Testing ====
Bend Testing assess the strength and ductility of welded joints by bending the welded sample to a pre-determined radius. Guided bend tests, generally performed perpendicular to the weld axis, utilize wraparound jigs or a plunger-type machine. The face bend test applies tension to the weld face, while the root bend test applies tension to the weld root. For thicker samples, side bend tests are preferred, focusing on the cross-sectional area of the plate. This testing procedure is highly effective for identifying fusion defects and is extensively used to evaluate skills of a welder. Bend tests examine the quality of the weld joint at both the root and face, assessing fusion, penetration into the base metal, and overall weld integrity. Specimens are designed to fit the bending jig's capacity, positioned on die supports, and bent with a hydraulic press. To meet weld quality standards, specimens must withstand a 180-degree bend without surface fractures exceeding 3.2 mm.

==== Impact Testing ====
Impact Testing evaluates the toughness of a material by measuring its ability to absorb energy during impact loading at a specific temperature. This test determines the transition temperature at which a material changes from ductile, energy-absorbing behavior to brittle, fracture-prone behavior without significant deformation. Identifying this transition is critical to ensuring structures operate within a temperatures range that maintains ductility, thereby preventing brittle failure. The S-curve, often used as a reference in impact testing, depicts energy absorption as a function of temperature. The curve shows that ductile fractures absorb significantly more energy, indicating superior toughness. Factors such as material composition, thermal treatment, and welding parameters influence test results. Controlling these factors is essential to achieving optimal toughness, particularly in welding applications that require high resistance to impact loads.

== Techniques ==
Welders and weld inspectors utilize a range of tools and devices to ensure safety and maintain quality throughout the welding process. Protective gear is crucial for safety, such as welding helmets with eye protection, gloves, and respirators is essential for safeguarding against heat, sparks, and hazardous fumes. To ensure quality, measuring tools like calipers, micrometers, and weld gauges are employed to verify weld dimensions and ensuring adherence to specified standards. During and after welding, visual inspection tools like welding cameras, borescopes, and magnifying lenses, enable detailed evaluations of welds to detect surface imperfections and ensure quality control.

Advanced Non-Destructive Testing (NDT) tools are crucial for evaluating weld integrity without causing material damage. These include X-ray machines, ultrasonic testing devices, Magnetic Particle Inspection (MPI) kits, and pre-weld inspection systems. Additionally, specialized tools such as seam monitors and weld bead scanners provide enhanced precision in weld assessments.

=== Welding Cameras ===
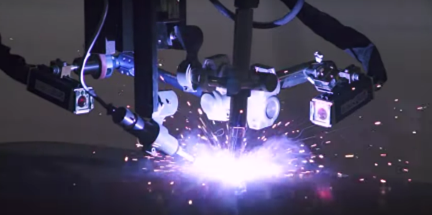
A pair of weld cameras integrated into an automated welding system, used for real-time welding process monitoring. IRCO Automation and Xiris Automation

Welding cameras have revolutionized modern manufacturing by significantly improving the ability to monitor and control the welding process. Equipped with advanced optical systems, these welding cameras offer exceptional capabilities for real-time monitoring and precision control of weld operations. With weld cameras, operators can ensure safety, inspect welding operations remotely, and maintain precision. By allowing operators to remotely observe the welding process, they enhance safety and ensure quality consistently. The technology embedded in weld cameras includes robust image sensors and specialized optical filters, that enable them to operate effectively under extreme conditions involving heat, intense light, and radiation. This makes them indispensable in demanding welding environments.

Weld cameras are versatile, the technology can function across a variety of welding types, including manual, automated, and robotic welding applications. They can capture high-quality images and videos of the critical elements such as the weld pool, welding arc, filler metal, tungsten and the joint. The ability to visually monitor these components in real time allows operators to detect and correct potential defects in the weld.

==== Digitalization and Role in Automation ====
The integration of machine learning and high-dynamic-range (HDR) imaging has elevated the role of welding cameras, making them indispensable in modern manufacturing sectors. High Dynamic Range technology enables these cameras to function effectively in environments with intense light variations, capturing detailed and clear images of the weld pool and surrounding areas. This type of technology ensures accurate monitoring even in the challenging visual conditions typical of welding operations.

Welding cameras typically utilize advance sensor technologies such as Charge-Coupled Device (CCD) and Complementary Metal-Oxide-Semiconductor (CMOS). These sensors convert captured light into electrical signals, which are then processed using sophisticated image analysis and pattern recognition algorithms. These algorithm leverage machines are learning to interpret the visual data, enabling the detection of defects, optimization of weld parameters, and enhancement of overall welding quality.

By combining HDR imaging with machine learning, welding cameras not only improve real-time defect detection but also provide actionable insights for adaptive process control. This integration plays a critical role in enhancing efficiency, precision, and consistency in manufacturing applications.

==== Industrial and Research Applications ====
Welding cameras are extensively used in research and development settings. In real-time applications, these cameras have been reported to detect weld line edges, as well as vertical and horizontal weld lines. These features are essential for activities like analyzing weld geometry, tracing seams, and spotting irregularities in the welding process.

Thermal Welding Cameras offer unique advantages by distinguishing the temperature differences within the welding scene. It can identify the borders of the melt pool and enables precise monitoring of its geometric attributes, including shape, size, and location. This capability is valuable under challenging conditions such as varying camera angles, low lighting, and confined workspaces.

Monochrome welding cameras analyze pixel distributions and grayscale intensity values in captured images. Based on preset criteria, statistical methods like the Gaussian distribution and chi-square tests help in categorizing welds as excellent, excessive, inadequate, or faulty. Defect detection and quality evaluations are improved by automated technologies such as back-propagation neural network classifiers.

Colored welding cameras offer weld monitoring on the next level by capturing full-color views that make it easier to distinguish between the arc, weld pool components, and surrounding surfaces. This added dimension improves the capacity to identify minute and subtle changes in the appearance of the weld, such as contamination, oxidation, or irregularities in the distribution of filler metal. Because of this, colored weld cameras are extremely helpful for thorough inspection and quality control, particularly in fields where determining the integrity of the weld depends heavily on visual indicators.

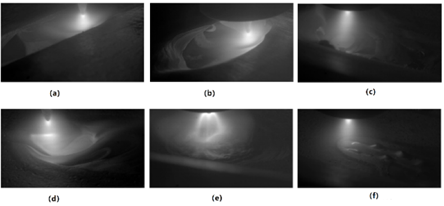
Data set of weld images collected by a student researcher to identify good welds and defects using a weld camera.

==== Educational and Specialized Uses ====
To assist students and trainees, in comprehending the complexities of welding procedures, welding cameras are being used extensively in technical and vocational training programs. High-speed cameras, in particular, provide the ability to show the welding process in slow motion, allowing operators to study small but significant features like filler material application, weld pool development, and arc behavior. This type of visual representation helps in teaching proper welding techniques and spotting any mistakes before they happen in real-life scenarios. In some specific production processes like Wire Arc Additive Manufacturing (WAAM), weld cameras are used to observe the weld pool and adjacent regions without being disrupted by strong arc light ensuring continuous quality monitoring. This capability allows operators and trainees to observe and control the deposition and solidification of material during the additive manufacturing process, ensuring consistency and reducing potential defects. Some high-speed weld cameras are capable of recording at rates such as 500 frames per second (fps), which is essential for researching phenomena like heat distribution, spatter production, and molten pool oscillations during the welding process. The data collected can be used in refining welding parameters, minimizing defects, and maximizing the overall accuracy of weld processes in industrial settings.

Weld Cameras are integral to monitoring the joining process, ensuring precision and consistency in both weld path and material deposition. This is especially important in industries where accuracy is vital, such as in production of complex components for the automobile and aerospace sectors. By facilitating clear visibility of the solidification and build-up stages, welding cameras aid in process control and support quality assurance efforts. Key components of weld monitoring systems include:

- High-resolution cameras: Designed to capture detailed images of the welding procedure. These cameras operate effectively in harsh environments like high temperatures, intense light, and fluctuating working environment. With advanced sensors, these cameras provide clear images of the weld arc and its surrounding regions, even significant dynamic light variations.
- Image processing software: Software acts as a brain for every inspection system. Interactive software helps in analyzing the captured images and videos to provide actionable feedback to the automated systems or welding operators. The software programs are used to display the findings and identify weld defects such as lack of fusion, misalignment, or porosity. Some advanced systems may also incorporate features like pattern recognition and heat analysis features, further enhancing defect detection.
- Lighting and Filters: Proper illumination and filter improve visual quality and remove interference from ambient lighting, arc light glare, and reflections. Strong light sources effectively light the weld region, while bandpass, neutral density, polarizing and other such filters are used to control high-intensity brightness, and focus on specific wavelengths for in-depth monitoring.
- Protective Housings and Mounting Systems: Protective housings shield the camera's optics, sensors, and other sensitive parts from heat, sparks, and debris. Mounting systems made from heat-resistant material offer optimal positioning of the vision systems and provide flexible angle adjustments. The monitoring system is usually also equipped with cooling system to function optimally in extreme conditions. Various welding configurations, such as robotic arms and stationary equipment, benefit from adaptable housing, mounting and cooling options.
- Data Storage and Communication Systems: Weld camera systems feature secure storage solutions and efficient data transmission capabilities. Monitoring systems integrate seamlessly with production management systems through communication protocols such as Wi-Fi, Ethernet, or industrial IoT standards, ensuring seamless data integration.

=== Image Sensors ===
Welding cameras use specialized sensors that can function in situations with high levels of light and heat, typical of welding operations. These sensors are critical in capturing clear, detailed pictures of the weld zone, despite the limitations of high-intensity arc light and harsh conditions. One of the distinguishing properties of these sensors is their ability to handle the high dynamic range (HDR) of light generated during welding. This feature guarantees that the brightest and darkest regions of the welding environment are appropriately recorded without overexposure or loss of detail. The sensors are integrated with innovative electrical components that respond to quick variations in light intensity, allowing for real-time monitoring of the welding process. Welding cameras utilize a variety of sensors, based on their use and the quality and safety standards. Below are some common types of sensors used in welding cameras:

==== Visible Light Sensors (CCD/CMOS) ====
CCD (Charge-Coupled Device) and CMOS (Complementary Metal-Oxide-Semiconductor) sensors are widely employed in welding cameras to capture typically visible light pictures. These sensors provide high-resolution pictures, making them ideal for monitoring welding operations and evaluating weld quality. CMOS sensors are more power-efficient and cost-effective than CCDs, although they may provide somewhat inferior picture quality.

==== Infrared Sensors ====
Near-infrared (NIR) sensors are used to detect heat signatures and monitor the welding arc and surrounding regions where visible light may be excessively intense. These sensors are critical for monitoring weld quality and maintaining correct heat distribution. Thermal imaging uses Long-wave Infrared (LWIR) sensors, which enable welders and inspectors to monitor the temperature of the weld joint and its surroundings. These help in detecting overheating or probable faults in real-time.

==== Ultraviolet (UV) Sensors ====
UV sensors are used to collect and analyze UV radiation produced during the welding process. These sensors are critical for monitoring arc behavior and identify potential issues such as welding defects and exposure to damaging UV radiation.

==== High-Speed Sensors ====
Cameras with high-speed sensors are used to analyze high-speed welding operations and record rapid changes. These sensors can record hundreds of frames per second, allowing for more thorough welding inspection and analysis.

==== Multispectral and Hyperspectral Sensors ====
Multispectral sensors may record data at several wavelengths (e.g., visible light, near-infrared, and UV). They provide precise information about the welding process and are often used to monitor features like heat distribution and composition. Hyperspectral sensors give even more granular analysis by recording hundreds of wavelengths, enabling enhanced material analysis and detection of defects.

==== Logarithmic Response Sensors ====
Logarithmic response sensors are intended to handle scenarios with a large dynamic range, such as welding arcs. These sensors can capture both extremely bright and very dark regions in a single picture by compressing the range of light intensity. This is especially beneficial for welding cameras since it provides clear and detailed photographs of the welding process with no overexposure or underexposure, even when the light intensity fluctuates considerably. This makes them suitable for recording real-time data and conducting extensive inspections in environments with strong contrasts and large illumination fluctuations. In advanced systems, sensors are combined with edge recognition algorithms and machine learning techniques to automatically assess weld properties. This technological integration improves monitoring accuracy while also allowing for predictive maintenance and process improvement.

== Welding Cameras Used for Welding Operations ==
Weld cameras are vital tools in modern welding operations, providing precise monitoring and control of various welding processes. These cameras are categorized based on their design, functionality, and specific applications. Below is an overview of primary welding processes and the corresponding camera systems used for monitoring and adjustment.

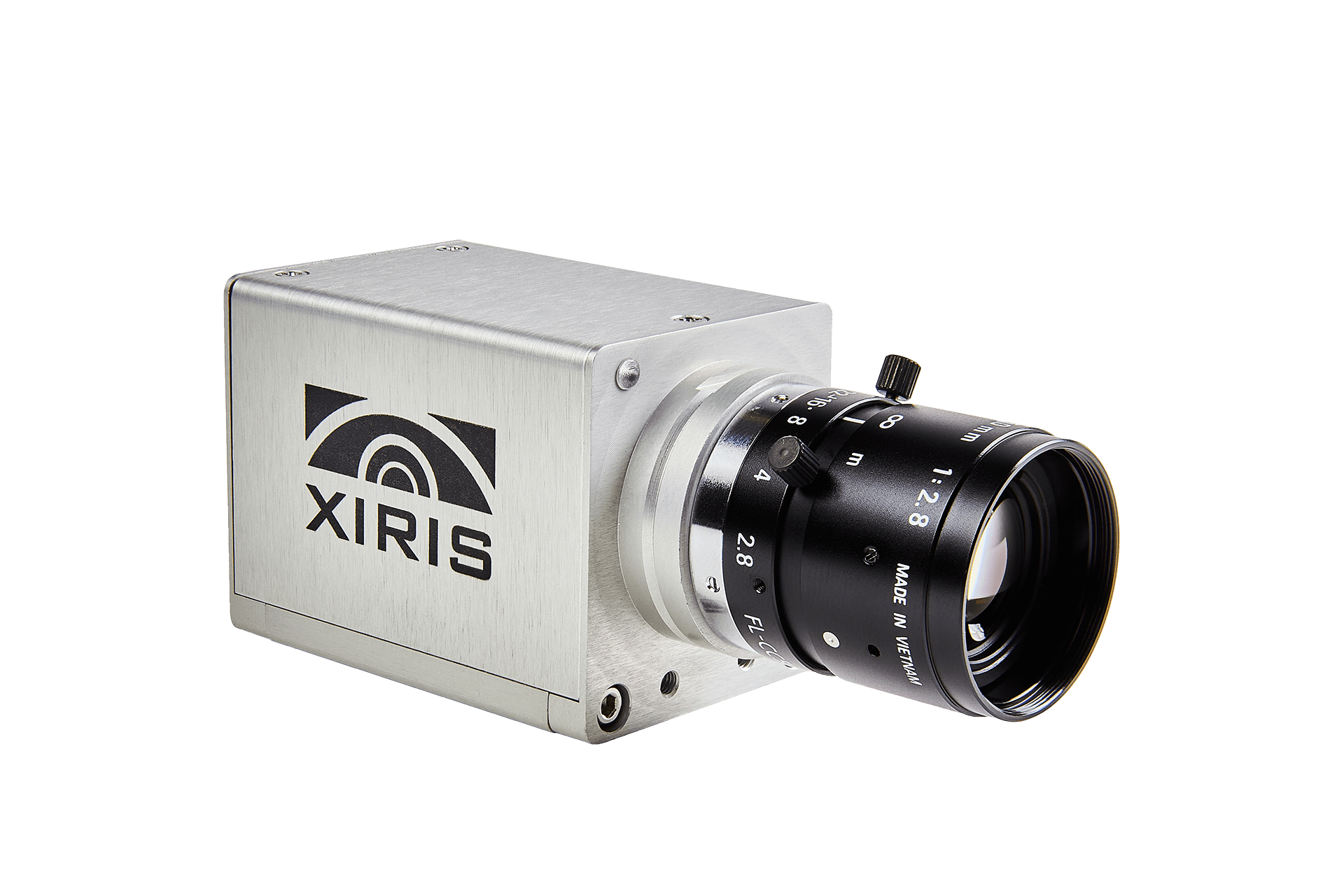
XVC-1000 Weld Camera

=== Shielded Metal Arc Welding (SMAW) Cameras ===
Shielded Metal Arc Welding, also known as Stick Welding or Manual Metal Arc Welding, is a widely used welding process for its simplicity and versatility. Cameras specifically designed for monitoring SMAW processes provide essential insights into arc stability, weld pool behavior, and overall weld quality. The specialized weld camera for SMAW combines advanced imaging technology with a modular design to support applications like research and development, education, and metal additive manufacturing. These cameras are equipped with a High Dynamic Range (HDR) capability of over 140 dB ensuring exceptional image quality, even in the intense brightness of the welding arc.

An example of a product designed for monitoring SMAW operations is the XVC-1000 weld camera. This camera enables operators to monitor and analyze welding operations with clarity. To optimize its utility in welding applications, such cameras are equipped with a range of welding-specific imaging software tools and features, including:

- Image Triggering: Synchronizes image capture precisely with welding events.
- General Purpose I/O: Facilitates integration with automated systems.
- Image Windowing: Allows focus on specific regions of interest for detailed analysis.
- Weld Arc Photodetector: Provides reliable arc detection to support process monitoring
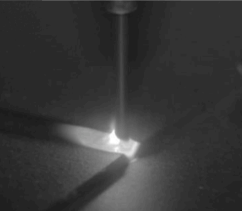
  Welding process captured by XVC-1000 weld camera

Weld cameras with these features are indispensable in industries such as construction, repair, and fabrication. They enable operators to identify defects early, fine-tune welding parameters, and enhance the overall efficiency and reliability of SMAW processes. Common defects in SMAW include porosity, inconsistent penetration, and undercutting. Weld Cameras enable the detection of porosity and undercutting by delivering clear visuals of the weld pool. Inconsistent penetration is another weld defect, identified through weld pool analysis, allowing operators to adjust the parameters to maintain consistent weld quality.

=== Gas Metal Arc Welding (GMAW) Cameras ===
Gas Metal Arc Welding (GMAW), commonly referred to as MIG (Metal Inert Gas) Welding, is a semi-automatic or robotic welding process that uses a continuously fed wire electrode and shielding gas. This type of welding is known for its high deposition rates, making it ideal for welding thinner materials. However, the need for shielding gas supply requires a controlled environment to ensure optimal performance. Cameras designed for GMAW operations provide comprehensive monitoring solutions. Equipped with HDR technology, these cameras capture detailed visuals of the welding arc and the surrounding area. Weld cameras for GMAW are available in various configurations to address diverse application requirements. An example is the XVC-700 camera, which is designed to capture Mono, Color, and Near-Infrared (NIR) images, suiting the versatility for a range of welding applications.

Thermal and infrared cameras offer an additional layer of analysis by enabling non-contact thermal imaging to monitor weld pool dynamics, heat distribution, and cooling rates. Infrared welding cameras provide non-contact thermal imaging for analyzing weld pool dynamics, heat distribution, and cooling rates. Infrared welding cameras are particularly valuable for ensuring weld integrity, enhancing process control and supporting defect detection in industries demanding high-performance standards.

Defects commonly associated with GMAW include spatter, cold laps, and lack of fusion. Industrial weld cameras used in modern monitoring systems allow operators to detect spatter and lack of fusion clearly defining all the characteristics of a weld. The ability to monitor the welding parameters in real time helps in adjusting settings to prevent defects in MIG welding.

=== Gas Tungsten Arc Welding (GTAW) Cameras ===
Also known as TIG (Tungsten Inert Gas) Welding, GTAW is a highly precise welding process that uses a non-consumable tungsten electrode. Depending on the application, a filler rod may or may not be used. This welding method is renowned for producing clean, high-quality welds, making it ideal for thin materials and industries that demand precision. However, GTAW is slower compared to other processes and demands a high-level skill to master.

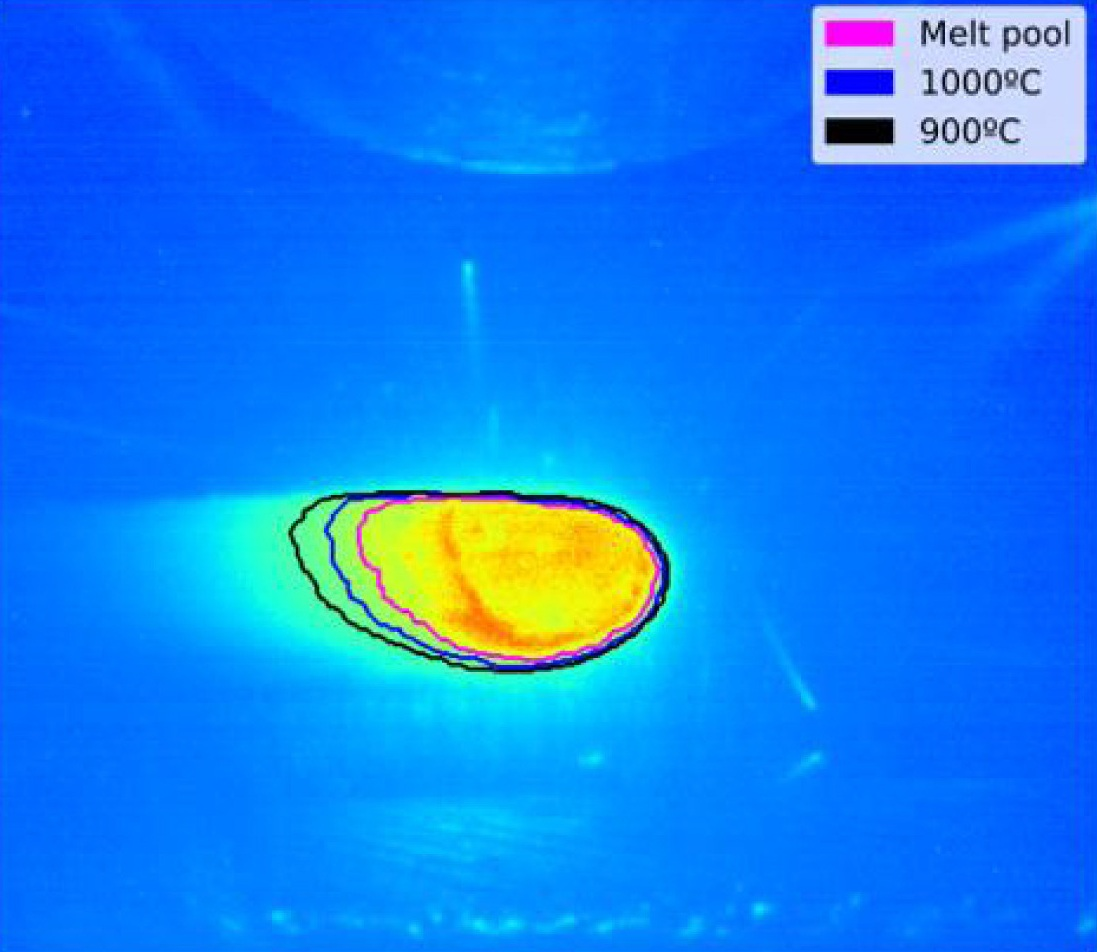
Image Processing software that uses Machine Vision and AI tools for tracking characteristics of the weld.

Cameras designed for TIG welding can capture clear and detailed visuals of the weld pool and surrounding area. Features like High Dynamic Range (HDR), and availability to operate in color, and mono configurations, are important to provide accurate visualization. Monitoring systems with TIG cameras must have a compact design to facilitate easier integration, while advanced imaging tools are necessary to enable real-time monitoring of critical parameters.

These cameras, paired with specialized image processing software, are particularly suited for delivering real-time insights into the welding process. Interactive software allows operators achieve consistent results, optimize welding parameters, and uphold the highest standards of weld quality. GTAW can undergo defects like burn-through, porosity, and irregular bead appearance, often result from improper techniques or incorrect parameters. Real-time visual data from the monitoring system allows prompt adjustments to ensure consistent bead quality and prevent defects.

=== Submerged Arc Welding (SAW) Cameras ===
Submerged Arc Welding (SAW) involves an arc submerged under a blanket of granular flux, which prevents spatter and sparks. This technique is widely recognized for its high deposition rates and deep penetration, making it ideal for welding large and thick materials in industries such as shipbuilding, pipeline construction, and structural fabrication. Conventional cameras are generally unsuitable for SAW, necessitating specialized imaging systems. Key features of specialized SAW cameras include:

- Visualization: Providing a clear view of critical elements like seam-to-wire alignment, wire feed, and flux coverage during welding.
- Robust Construction: Durable to endure harsh environments typical of SAW operations.
- Real-Time Monitoring: Incorporating High-speed imaging and HDR capabilities for detailed visuals of the welding process as it happens.
- Integration with Automated Systems: Compatibility with industrial automation to enhance process control and operational efficiency.

These cameras play a vital role in heavy industrial sectors, particularly in pipeline construction and shipbuilding, as they utilize specific imaging techniques capable of visualizing processes beneath the flux. For instance, cameras like the XVC-S100 exemplify a similar system, with features tailored to the demands of SAW. These specialized cameras help detect defects early, fine-tune welding parameters, and ensure adherence to stringent industry standards.

The SAW process is prone to defects such as undercutting, slag inclusion, and lack of fusion, which can compromise the durability and strength of the welded material. A monitoring system designed specifically for SAW is essential for overseeing the welding process, enabling detection and prevention of SAW defects to ensure reliability of the weld joint.

=== Plasma Arc Welding (PAW) Cameras ===
Plasma Arc Welding (PAW) is a welding process like Gas Tungsten Arc Welding (GTAW) but uses a constricted arc to achieve higher energy density. This characteristic makes PAW particularly suitable for automated welding operations in industries such as aerospace and electronics.

High-speed cameras, capable of capturing extremely high frame rates, are essential for analyzing material behavior, arc stability and spatter production during welding processes. These features allow the operators to evaluate the welding process in greater detail that supports quality optimization in advanced manufacturing and problem-solving in research and development.

Trapped gas bubbles are the defect associated with Plasma Arc Welding and is often caused by inadequate shielding or contaminated material. Other defects like gas reduction, overheating, and distortion can also occur which can be detected with detailed visuals of the arc and weld pool. Welding cameras offer insights into arc stability and other critical parameters, allowing immediate parameter adjustments to minimize distortion.

=== Laser Beam Welding (LBW) Cameras ===
Laser Beam Welding (LBW) is a process that uses a focused laser beam to melt and fuse metals, offering exceptional speed and accuracy. It is particularly effective in industries requiring precise joints, such as aerospace, automotive, and medical device manufacturing. To ensure optimal performance, monitoring systems are essential during the LBW process, and welding cameras play a crucial role.

The cameras provide enhanced visualization of the laser beam and the weld pool, allowing operators to fine-tune alignment and monitor key factors like beam focus, weld penetration, and heat distribution. This level of detail ensures that the welding process remains under tight control, minimizing defects and improving weld quality. Cameras with HDR imaging can effectively balance extreme lighting variations during welding, ensuring a clear view of both the bright laser and the darker surroundings. This capability is crucial for maintaining a stable weld process, especially in high-contrast environments.

In addition to HDR, structured lighting is another valuable feature that can be used with these weld cameras to improve visualization in challenging conditions, such as high-speed or high-temperature environments. This lighting technique enhances the ability to capture clear, detailed images of the weld pool and surrounding areas, ensuring that even the most subtle defects or misalignments can be detected early in the process. Distortion, Undercut, cracking and over penetrations are some of the weld defects associated with the LBW and can be easily detected with industrial weld cameras fabricated specifically for this purpose.
