= Uppercut (disambiguation) =

An uppercut is a punch used in boxing.

Uppercut may also refer to:

- Uppercut (bridge), a defensive play in contract bridge
- Uppercut (film), a 2025 film starring Ving Rhames
- Upper cut, in cricket terminology, a type of batsman's stroke
- "The Uppercut", a song by 2Pac from the album Loyal to the Game
- The Upper Cuts, a 2005 compilation album by Alan Braxe
- "Uppercut", a song by Stereophonics from Keep Calm and Carry On
- Uppercut (EP), an EP by Canadian singer and songwriter Morgan Finlay

== See also ==
- Undercut (disambiguation)
