= J. P. Nissen Co =

- Type: Private
- Industry: Manufacturing
- Founded: 1923, United States
- Founder: John P. Nissen Jr

Nissen Markers, a.k.a. J. P. Nissen Co was officially named the John P Nissen Jr Company is a privately held company which is still owned by the founding family based in Glenside, Pennsylvania. The company was founded in 1923 to manufacture markers for the textile industry and went on to receive numerous important patents on textile marking devices and methods. It is currently one of the largest manufacturers of industrial markers in the world.

== History ==
In 1923, John P. Nissen Jr. founded the J. P. Nissen Jr. Company in Philadelphia. Prior to founding the company, John Nissen studied chemistry at Rensselaer Polytechnic Institute and mechanical engineering at Massachusetts Institute of Technology. After MIT, he went to work for Vanity Fair Hosiery Mills in Reading, PA. While at Vanity Fair, he realized the company had a problem. The company's name eventually disappeared from the stockings, which caused warranty problems for Vanity Fair. The John P. Nissen Company was based on John Nissen's formula for an indelible ink to mark the stockings.

While largely unknown outside of its industry, the JP Nissen Company's many innovations were significant to manufacturing and labor. Its products included Dye-Resist Markers and a black Bleach Proof marker. The markers were used to mark bolts of cloth prior to dying and bleaching. These products allowed the textile industry to use unskilled labor, replacing the higher skilled employees who previously embroidered lot numbers on the bolts of cloth.

During World War II, the company manufactured markers that were used for the U.S. Navy personnel to mark their uniforms. The company sold these "clos-mar-king" markers to naval post exchanges until the 1980s.

During WW II, workers at the Baldwin Locomotive Works which was producing tanks for the US Army at that time, were using Nissen textile markers to mark the steel plates. The company decided to produce ball-point Metal Markers to better fulfill this need. Both Textile Markers and the Metal Markers are still used by J.P. Nissen Company today.

In the early 1970s, the company developed the first Low Chloride Metal Marker which was used for nuclear applications in defense works, nuclear-powered ships and nuclear power generating plants.

Now more than 85 years old, the company sells its markers in over 81 countries. In 2009, longtime employee Robert Pali succeeded Peter Nissen as president and Chief Operating Officer. Robert Pali is currently serving his second term as the treasurer for the American Welding Society. Additionally in 2006 he was the American Welding Society's recipient of the National Meritorious Certificate Award in recognition for his years of service with the organization.

== Patents ==
Amongst J.P. Nissen's many patented innovations are:

- a printing roller which, according to the patent, "has been particularly useful in the printing of fabric, and especially hosiery, wherein designs, trademarks, and the like, are permanently applied" issued on Dec 18, 1928.

- a marking implement that, according to the patent, could be "cheaply manufactured, so that when the material is entirely used, the implement can be discarded" issued on Dec 29, 1931.

- an implement for applying fluent materials issued on Jul 5, 1941.

- a Design for a tip of marking elements (a nip) issued on Nov 18, 1941.

- a Collapsible tube (essential to the evolution of the marking pen) issued on Dec 21, 1943.
