= Clive Lyle =

Fictional character

Clive Lyle is a fictional character appearing in the last three of the five novels written by Peter Niesewand, the late South African journalist who spent 73 days in solitary confinement for his coverage of the last years of Ian Smith's government in Rhodesia (now Zimbabwe). He features as a United States agent, working variously for the CIA and the DIA, and he uses his ambiguous (or perhaps merely ambivalent) sexuality ("Is that [homosexuality] true about you, Clive?" / "Not necessarily") to great advantage in The Word of a Gentleman and, more generally, on the face of it seems to treat sexual activity as not much more than simply a means to an end - notwithstanding an intriguing scene in Niesewand's fourth novel, 'Fallback', in which a presumably inebriated Lyle, hosting a (very unimpressed) male intimate, recklessly causes beer to be spilled on his own carpet, apparently without regret.

Lyle contrasts sharply with the recognisably humane David Cane in Fallback: Cane is sacrificed in the interests of national security but Lyle, introduced as Cane's replacement, ultimately trains Martin Ross to infiltrate Vologda and thereby to sabotage an offensive Soviet ICBM programme. But in Scimitar Lyle acquires a more human aspect; recognising this, he reflects on it ("Well that's something I never did, I never killed a kid") as he and David Ross return to America (via Pakistan) from Afghanistan.

Lyle appears in: The Word of a Gentleman (1981), republished as Undercut in 1984, Fallback (1981), and Scimitar (1983).
