= Undercut =

Undercut may refer to:

- Price slashing, a pricing technique designed to eliminate competition
- Undercut procedure, a procedure for fair allocation of indivisible objects.
- Undercut (boxing), a type of boxing punch
- Undercut (film), a stunt people film
- Undercut (hairstyle), a type of hairstyle
- Undercut (manufacturing), a recess that is inaccessible using a straight tool
- Undercut (welding), a defect that reduces the strength of a weld
- Undercut (novel), a Peter Niesewand novel
- Undercut (road work), excavation work performed in road replacement projects
- Undercut (rock climbing), a climbing hold that is pulled on in an upward direction
- Undercutting, the act of winning a hand in Gin Rummy by having a deadwood count that is less than or equal to that of the knocking opponent after the round ends
- Undercutting in motor racing, the tactic of taking an early pit stop
