= Welding Procedure Specification =

Welding document

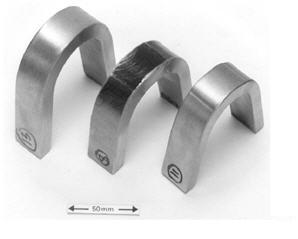
Bend test coupons for welding procedure qualification.

A Welding Procedure Specification (WPS) is a formal document describing welding procedures. It is an internal document used by welding companies to instruct welders (or welding operators) on how to achieve quality production welds that meet all relevant code requirements. Each company typically develops their own WPS for each material alloy and for each welding type used. Specific codes and/or engineering societies are often the driving force behind the development of a company's WPS. A WPS is supported by a Procedure Qualification Record (PQR or WPQR), a formal record of a test weld performed and rigorously tested to ensure that the procedure will produce a good weld. Individual welders are certified with a qualification test documented in a Welder Qualification Test Record (WQTR) that shows they have the understanding and demonstrated ability to work within the specified WPS.

== Introduction ==
The following are definitions for WPS and PQR found in various codes and standards:

According to the American Welding Society (AWS), a WPS provides in detail the required welding variables for specific application to assure repeatability by properly trained welders. The AWS defines welding PQR as a record of welding variables used to produce an acceptable test weldment and the results of tests conducted on the weldment to qualify a Welding Procedure Specification. For steel construction (civil engineering structures) AWS D1.1 is a widely used standard. It specifies either a pre-qualification option (chapter 3) or a qualification option (chapter 4) for approval of welding processes.

The American Society of Mechanical Engineers (ASME) similarly defines a WPS as a written document that provides direction to the welder or welding operator for making production welds in accordance with Code requirements. ASME also defines welding PQR as a record of variables recorded during the welding of the test coupon. The record also contains the test results of the tested specimens.

The Canadian Welding Bureau, through CSA Standards W47.1, W47.2 and W186, specifies both a WPS and a Welding Procedure Data Sheet (WPDS) to provide direction to the welding supervisor, welders and welding operators. The WPS provides general information on the welding process and material grouping being welded, while the WPDS provides specific welding variables/parameter/conditions for the specific weldment. All WPS and WPDS must be independently reviewed and accepted by the Canadian Welding Bureau prior to use. These CSA standards also define requirements for procedure qualification testing (PQT) to support the acceptance of the WPDS. A record of the procedure qualification test and the results must be documented on a procedure qualification record (PQR). All PQTs are independently witnessed by the Canadian Welding Bureau.

In Europe, the European Committee for Standardization (CEN) has adopted the ISO standards on welding procedure qualification (ISO 15607 to ISO 15614), which replaced the former European standard EN 288. EN ISO 15607 defines a WPS as "A document that has been qualified by one of the methods described in clause 6 and provides the required variables of the welding procedure to ensure repeatability during production welding". The same standard defines a Welding Procedure Qualification Record (WPQR) as "Record comprising all necessary data needed for qualification of a preliminary welding procedure specification". In addition to the standard WPS qualification procedure specified in ISO 15614, the ISO 156xx series of standards provides also for alternative WPS approval methods. These include: Tested welding consumables (ISO 15610), Previous welding experience (ISO 15611), Standard welding procedure (ISO 15612) and Preproduction welding test (ISO 15613).

In the oil and gas pipeline sector, the American Petroleum Institute API 1104 standard is used almost exclusively worldwide. API 1104 accepts the definitions of the American Welding Society code AWS A3.0.

WPS is of two types- Prequalified WPS (pWPS) & qualified WPS.

== See also ==
- List of welding codes
- Welder certification
- Welding
- How to write a welding procedure specification (ISO 15614-1)
- Writing compliant welding procedure specifications
- ISO 15614-1 (2017) Changes and Updates from previous versions

== List of standards ==
- ASME Boiler and Pressure Vessel Code section IX: "Qualification Standard for welding and brazing procedures, welders, brazers and welding and brazing operators"
- EN ISO 15607: "Specification and qualification of welding procedures for metallic materials - General rules (ISO 15607:2003)"
- EN ISO 15609: "Specification and qualification of welding procedures for metallic materials - Welding procedure specification (ISO 15609)", five parts.
- EN ISO 15614: "Specification and qualification of welding procedures for metallic materials - Welding procedure test (ISO 15614)", 13 parts.
- API 1104: "Welding of pipelines and related facilities", parts 5 (procedures)
