= Welder certification =

Certification process for welders

Welder certification, also known as welder qualification, is a process which examines and documents a welder's capability to create welds of acceptable quality following a well defined welding procedure.

== Method ==
Welder certification is based on specially designed tests to determine a welder's skill and ability to deposit sound weld metal. The main part of the welder's test consists of welding one or more test coupons which are then examined using non-destructive and destructive methods. The extent of certification is described by a number of variables, which include the specific welding process, type of deposited metal, thickness, joint design, position, backing, and others. Most often, the test is conducted in accordance with a particular code. Depending on product requirements the test can be administered under the auspices of a national or international organization, such as the American Welding Society (AWS), or American Society of Mechanical Engineers (ASME), but manufacturers may specify their own standards and requirements as well. Most certifications expire after a certain time limit, and have different requirements for renewal or extension of the certification.

In the USA, welder qualification is performed according to AWS D1.1, ASME Section IX and API 1104 standards, which are also used in some other countries. Some States have their own Welder Qualifications that supersede AWS Qualifications, but most defer to AWS, ASME or API.

In Canada, welder qualification is carried out according to CSA Standards and ASME. The ASME code is typically used for pressure vessel and pressure piping applications, and CSA Standards are used for structural, general manufacturing and non-pressure applications. There are 3 major CSA Standards to which welders may be qualified: CSA W47.1 for steels (including stainless steels), CSA W47.2 for aluminum, and CSA W186 for reinforcing bars. Under these CSA standards, welder qualification testing is carried out every 2 years by the Canadian Welding Bureau to ensure ongoing competence.

In Europe, the European Committee for Standardization (CEN) has adopted the ISO standards on welder qualification (ISO 9606), to replace the old European EN 287 series. Operators of automated welding systems are certified according to EN 1418. In Europe welders are often certified by third party Personnel Certification Bodies, like The Welding Institute (TWI/CSWIP). Welders involved in the manufacture of equipment that falls within the scope of the Pressure Equipment Directive must be approved by a competent third party which may be either a notified body or a third-party organization recognized by a Member State.

Once a welder passes a test (or a series of tests), their employer or third party involved will certify their ability to pass the test, and the limitations or extent they are qualified to weld, as a written document (welder qualification test record, or WQTR). Normally this document is valid for a limited period (usually for two years), after which the welder must be retested. However some Qualifications are only valid for a single project, while others are unlimited as long as welders do not go beyond a specified length of time without performing that specific type of welding (this period is typically 6 months). Welders must maintain a log to demonstrate they have maintained their Qualifications.

== Welding inspector certification ==
In addition to welders and welding machine operators, there are also schemes to independently certify welding inspectors and related specialities. The duties of the welding inspector are described in ISO 14731; however the requirement for inspector certification are not standardized, so there are differences in requirement between the various schemes. Some notable schemes established by personnel certification bodies are those of the American Welding Society, of the British Institute of Non-Destructive Testing (PCN), of The Welding Institute (CSWIP) and of the Canadian Welding Bureau (CSA W178.2).

The American Welding Society offers the following programs:

- Certified Associate Welding Inspector
- Certified Welding Inspector
- Senior Certified Welding Inspector
- Certified Radiographic Interpreter

The British Institute of Non-Destructive Testing offers three levels of certification:

- PCN Level 1
- PCN Level 2 Weld Inspection
- PCN Level 3 Weld Inspection with radiographic interpretation

The Welding Institute (TWI) in the United Kingdom offers the following certification scheme:

- CSWIP 3.0 (Level 1): Visual Welding Inspector
- CSWIP 3.1 (Level 2): Welding Inspector
- CSWIP 3.2 (Level 3): Senior Welding Inspector; with or without radiographic interpretation (3.2.1 or 3.2.2 respectively)

The Canadian Welding Bureau offers the following programs:

- Level 1 Certified Welding Inspector
- Level 2 Certified Welding Inspector
- Level 3 Certified Welding Inspector

The BINDT/PCN and TWI/CSWIP schemes are accredited by UKAS under ISO/IEC 17024. There are many other general schemes, as well as sector specific schemes.

In 2008, the American Petroleum Institute introduced the API 577 Advanced Welding Inspection and Metallurgy programme of certification. Certification is issued following the successful completion of a multiple choice exam which is based on the recommended practice document API 577. Certification identifies the candidate as a 'Welding Inspection and Metallurgy Professional', as opposed to a certified welding inspector under other programmes.

== See also ==
- Welding
- Welding Procedure Specification
- List of welding codes

== External links and further reading ==
- Canadian Welding Bureau (CWB) home page
- American Welding Society (AWS) home page
- Davis, A. (July 2003). "Welder Qualification Standards - Philosophy and Feedback" (PDF). AWS Welding Journal (PDF): 14–16.
- Welding Inspection Handbook (3rd ed.). Miami, FL: American Welding Society. 2000. ISBN 0-87171-560-0.
- Canadian Welding Association (CWA) home page
- TWI Certification Ltd (UK) CSWIP scheme
- "EWF Guide to deal with the transition from EN 287-1 to EN ISO 9606-1 as efficiently as possible (EWF-654-13)" (PDF) (PDF). European Federation for Welding, Joining and Cutting (EWF). 2013. Archived from the original (PDF) on 2013-12-12.
