= Morgan Finlay =

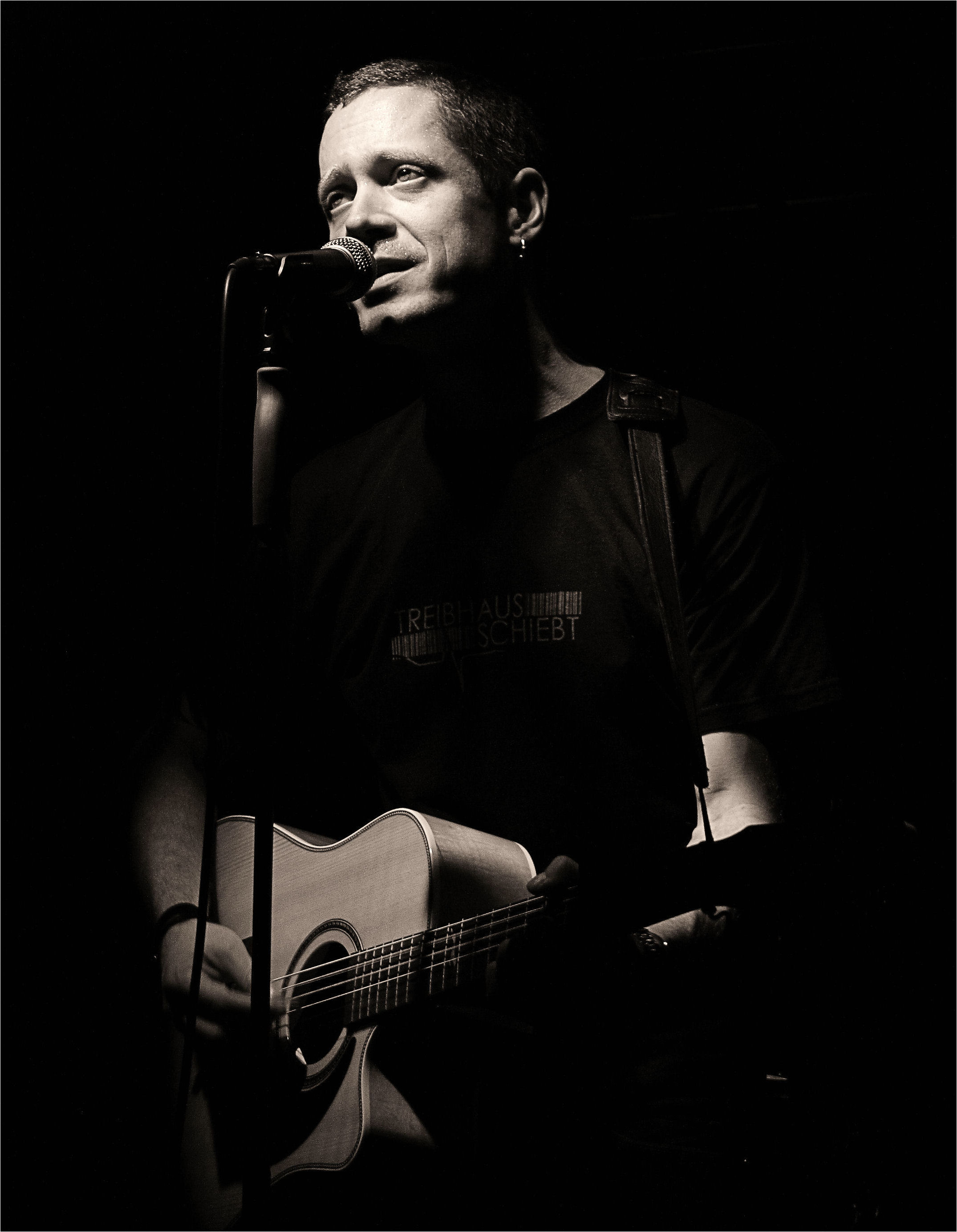

Background information
- Born: Morgan Pendleton
- Origin: North Vancouver, British Columbia, Canada
- Genres: Singer-songwriter, folk, contemporary folk, roots, country
- Occupation: Singer/songwriter
- Instruments: Guitar, vocals
- Years active: 2002 – present
- Labels: Brisco Bodai
- Website: www.morganfinlay.com

Morgan Finlay is a Canadian singer-songwriter from North Vancouver, British Columbia, and based for much of his career in Toronto, Ontario. Finlay has released eight recordings in Europe and Canada, including one duo album recorded with Christoph Schellhorn as MFCS. Finlay's first-ever single "zensong" reached No. 2 on the Australian Independent Radio Charts in 2004. His latest solo album New Harbour was written and recorded in New Harbour, Newfoundland, St. John's, Newfoundland and Chemnitz, Germany and was released on December 1, 2015.

== Early life ==
Morgan Finlay is an Irish-Canadian singer-songwriter from North Vancouver, British Columbia, currently residing in Sevilla, Spain. He began performing musically at the age of five, and from 1984 to 1991 he competed in the Kiwanis Music Festivals in Vancouver, both individually and with ensembles. In 1986 he sang in both the Vancouver Opera’s performance of The Magic Flute, and the Canadian premiere of Andrew Lloyd Webber’s Requiem. The following year he sang in the Vancouver Opera's The Cunning Little Vixen. In 1992 his acapella group The End won the Canadian Youth Talent Search, and represented Canada at the international finals in Memphis, Tennessee, where they tied for 7th place. With Finlay in The End was Trevor Guthrie, future member of soulDecision and co-writer/performer of "This Is What It Feels Like"’, with Armin Van Buuren.

== Style ==
Much of Finlay's music is in a singer-songwriter style, with overtones of folk, roots, and country. Among his musical influences he has cited Mark Knopfler, Sufjan Stevens, Eddie Vedder, Bruce Cockburn and JJ Cale.

== Career ==
=== Early career ===
At the beginning of his professional musical career, Finlay moved from Vancouver to Montreal, hoping to pursue a life as a solo musician. He soon recognized that Toronto was the place to be, and moved there in the summer of 2002. While in Toronto he met and played acoustically for Canadian producer Matt DeMatteo, who subsequently decided to work on Finlay's debut EP. DeMatteo, who had previously worked with Edwin, Big Wreck and Ashley MacIsaac, introduced him at the time to Peter Murray, who became his regular bassist until 2010.

=== Uppercut EP (2002) release and Ontario/Quebec shows ===
Finlay released his first solo EP, Uppercut, on October 1, 2002. The six-track EP was released independently on his own record label, Brisco Bodai Productions, and covered a variety of styles including rock, acoustic, and funk. The EP's single "zensong" achieved airplay on the CBC and on various college and internet radio stations during 2003 and 2004. "zensong" also peaked at No. 22 in the CFBX Kelowna Top 30.

With Uppercut, Finlay began to perform on the local Toronto scene, and in January 2003 he began touring the Ontario college campus circuit. In the two years following Uppercut's release, Finlay played in clubs in Toronto and Montreal, in festivals across Ontario and at multiple campuses across Ontario and Quebec. He also opened for Tom Cochrane and Sass Jordan at Windsor's Freedom Festival on Canada Day on July 1, 2003.

=== Splice EP (2004) and first European tour ===
Finlay's second EP, Splice, was in a more acoustic and stripped-down style than ‘Uppercut’, and was released in early 2004. At this point Finlay was being recognized in the music scene in Toronto. In April 2004, the single from Uppercut, "zensong" was included on Daryl Hurs' Gen Sub records compilation, which was sent to contacts around the world. During this period "zensong"’ achieved the No. 2 spot on the Australian Independent Radio Charts.

Finlay's track on the Gen Sub compilation CD was also heard by promoter Michael Schurr of Modern Noise in Mainburg, Germany. Following discussions between Hurs and Schurr in Berlin, a 19-day, 16-show tour of Germany and Austria was arranged for April 2005, which Finlay opted to perform solo. The tour was a success, and a second European tour in fall 2005 had been completely booked by the end of the summer. Disagreements arose between Schurr and Finlay, and beginning with the fall tour Finlay began being booked in Germany by Matte Vandeven of Sound of Liberation, and in Austria by Klaus Plewa of Ink Music.

=== Everything Will Work Out Right (2005) ===
In 2005, while still based in both Toronto and beginning to tour in Germany and Austria, Finlay released his first full-length record, Everything Will Work Out Right. The album was released internationally on both the Brisco Bodai and Sound of Liberation labels. Containing five songs from the Uppercut EP, and four songs from Splice, it also featured two songs which were recorded in Toronto with Justin Abedin on electric guitar, Chris Lamont on drums, and Peter Murray on bass. Finlay toured this album for nearly two years, beginning in the fall of 2005. In December 2005, Finlay opened for Roger Hodgson in Heilbronn, Germany.

=== Shifting Through the Breakers (2007) and first recordings in Germany ===
His second full album release, 2007's Shifting Through the Breakers, saw Finlay continuing with a contemporary rock sound. The album was recorded at SmartArts Studio in Moosburg, Germany, and was produced by Peter Murray, who once again played bass. The album included fan favorites "(in)Security" and "Blessing and Burning," as well as Finlay's first foreign-language singles, "Bei Dir Sein" and "Mourir d'envie'." Finlay would tour in support of this album for nearly a year and a half, as he resided briefly in Berlin, and then in Bern, Switzerland while maintaining a base in Toronto.

=== Touring pause in Vancouver ===
By the end of 2008, constant touring had begun to take a toll. With his professional relationship with Sound Of Liberation effectively on hiatus, after his fifth European tour in the fall of 2008, he chose to return to Vancouver to take a break from touring and regroup. From 2002 to 2008, Finlay had performed nearly 400 shows in Canada, Germany, Austria, England, Scotland, Wales, Switzerland,[11][12] Slovenia, Croatia and the Netherlands.

Finlay returned to Vancouver to live, worked in social work and maintained his touring connections in Europe, while writing demos and honing his home recording skills.

=== Fan involvement in his career ===
By the end of 2010, Finlay had written and recorded several demos. In December 2010— eight years after its release— he finished paying the recording and production costs of the Uppercut EP. Wanting to return to the road with a new album, but resistant to incurring brand new debt, he had arrived at a crossroads.

Finlay had heard about Kickstarter from a friend who suggested that he consider crowdfunding to fund his album, and in the end decided to do a campaign on Indiegogo.com, to raise funds to pay for the mixing and mastering of a new album, plus the costs of subsequently touring the album. The Latitude campaign was a success, and ended up 113% funded.

During the 90-day campaign, Finlay decided to ask his fans to vote for their favourite demos, which would then be the songlist for Latitude. The response was enthusiastic, and fans chose 12 songs for the album from 17 demos, with Finlay choosing the 13th song. The final track order was created from this process.

Finally, Finlay invited fans to make videos for the song of their choice from Latitude; their video would be featured on FinlayTV, his YouTube channel. Six videos were created for the album, and Finlay himself created videos for a final four songs.

=== Latitude (2012) and the return to the road ===
Finlay's third full-length release, Latitude was officially released on January 1, 2012, and features performances by Dean Drouillard (guitar), Mike Olsen (cello), Brendan Hamley (drums), Marlow Holder (bass), Katheryn Petersen (accordion) and Jake Roeder (guitar). It is with Latitude that Finlay began to detach from his rock ambitions, and steer deeper into an acoustic folk direction.

His return to the road was complete when the "Latitude Tour" officially began on March 19, 2012, in Mainz (a private show took place on March 17, for members of the MF Inner Circle in Wuppertal). The "Latitude Tour" totalled 16 dates in Germany and Austria.

=== Fault Lines (2013) in Ireland ===
After finishing his seventh European tour in the spring of 2013, Finlay moved to Ireland to work on a new album. In the face of the costs to make the new album, Finlay again launched a crowdfunding campaign on Indiegogo. In his second crowdfunding campaign, Finlay offered not only merchandise, but also guitar lessons, living room concerts and custom-written songs. The campaign was very popular, and ended up 161% funded.

The album's core writing and recording sessions were in Shanahill, County Kerry in the summer of 2013, and together with performances from Brendan Hamley, Igor Leonardi, Sam Bates, Jake Roeder and Martin Dietl, the album made a splash on its release in October 2013. Stylistically, it brought the simplicity of his acoustic folk into a more rootsy, alt-country direction and the upbeat songs were broadly welcomed by his listeners.

Fault Lines was published in October 2013, and was officially released with a new tour that brought Finlay across Germany, Austria and Switzerland. Still touring Fault Lines, he crossed the 500-show mark in October 2014 in Schwerin, Germany.

=== Foundations: MFCS (2015) ===
After performing at a house concert with Austrian guitarist Christoph Schellhorn in late 2013, Finlay and Schellhorn decided to make a record together, and for the purposes of the album and the subsequent touring, decided to name their collaboration MFCS. The album was unofficially considered a "best of Morgan Finlay", as it consisted only of songs composed by Finlay. This album also included a brand new Morgan Finlay song, "Let Me Down Gently" which quickly became a popular song in live performances. The album was released at the start of the MFCS "Brave Souls Tour" in April 2015.

=== New Harbour (2015) and fall tour ===
In June 2015, at the final tour stop on the "Brave Souls" Tour in Vienna, Finlay launched his third crowdfunding campaign on Indiegogo, to finance the writing and recording of his sixth full-length album. The campaign lasted 45 days, and achieved its goal in under 30 days to end up 149% funded.

Finlay traveled to Newfoundland in the end of July 2015, and wrote and recorded the first demos in New Harbour. Photos for the album book were taken in New Harbour, in Gros Morne Provincial Park, Trout River, Flat Rock and finally in St. John's. The final recording sessions took place in Mount Pearl, where Finlay recorded performances by Aaron Collis, Darren Browne and Duane Andrews.

New Harbour was officially released on December 1, 2015, with four shows in a row in Berlin. The album was made available as a digital album once again, continuing Finlay's commitment to better sound quality (song files can be downloaded in FLAC, WAV and all lossless formats), and more and bigger images in the booklet. The "New Harbours Tour" included 38 shows in Germany, and 6 in Switzerland.

== Endorsements ==
Finlay is currently endorsed by Seagull Guitars (Godin), and has an artist's deal with D’Addario Canada. Since 2009, he has also been supported by Dayton Boots, of Vancouver.

== Personal life ==
Finlay is popularly seen as ‘constantly traveling’, and from 2000 to present has lived or stayed for extended periods of time in Vancouver, Montreal, Toronto, Berlin, Bern (Switzerland), County Kerry (Ireland), and Sevilla. His working background includes years of social work in Vancouver and Toronto, in particular with special needs and mental health. Finlay is an avid cyclist, and champions various social and environmental causes.

== Discography ==
=== Solo releases ===
- Uppercut EP (2002)
- Splice EP (2005)
- Everything Will Work Out Right (2005)
- Shifting Through the Breakers (2007)
- Latitude (2012)
- Fault Lines (2013)
- New Harbour (2015)
- Little Calm (2018)
- Shots of Light (2021)

=== Collaborations ===
- Foundations: MFCS (2015)
