= Shifting Through the Breakers =

Studio album by Morgan Finlay
- Released: 2007
- Genre: Pop

Morgan Finlay chronology
Everything Will Work Out Right (2005)	Shifting Through the Breakers (2007)

Shifting Through the Breakers is the second studio album released by Canadian singer and songwriter Morgan Finlay. It was released in 2007.

== Track listing ==
1. "(in)Security"
2. "Merge"
3. "Night at the Mercury"
4. "Sound of Industry"
5. "Bei dir sein"
6. "I Meant to Get You Back"
7. "Mourir d'envie"
8. "Take the Edge off"
9. "Mescaline"
10. "Blessing and Burning"
