= List of welding codes =

This page lists published welding codes, procedures, and specifications.

== American Society of Mechanical Engineers (ASME) Codes ==
The American Society of Mechanical Engineers (ASME) Boiler and Pressure Vessel Code (BPVC) covers all aspects of design and manufacture of boilers and pressure vessels. All sections contain welding specifications, however most relevant information is contained in the following:

Code	Description
ASME BPVC Section I	Rules for Construction of Power Boilers
ASME BPVC Section II	Part C: Specifications for Welding Rods, Electrodes and Filler Metals. (Note: Actually the ASME code adopts the AWS 5.* series of specifications and renames them as SFA 5.*)
ASME BPVC Section III	Rules for Constructions of Nuclear Facility Components-Subsection NCA-General Requirements for Division 1 and Division 2
ASME BPVC Section IV	Rules for Construction of Heating Boilers
ASME BPVC Section V	Nondestructive Examination
ASME BPVC Section VIII	Rules for Construction of Pressure Vessels Division 1 and Division 2
ASME BPVC Section IX	Welding and Brazing Qualifications
ASME B16.25	Buttwelding ends
ASME B31.1	Power Piping
ASME B31.3	Process Piping
ASME B31.9	Building Services Piping

== American Welding Society (AWS) Standards ==
The American Welding Society (AWS) publishes over 240 AWS-developed codes, recommended practices and guides which are written in accordance with American National Standards Institute (ANSI) practices. The following is a partial list of the more common publications:

Standard Number	Title
AWS A2.4	Standard symbols for welding, brazing, and non-destructive examination
AWS A3.0	Standard welding terms and definitions
AWS A5.1	Specification for carbon steel electrodes for shielded metal arc welding
AWS A5.18	Specification for carbon steel electrodes and rods for gas shielded arc welding
AWS B1.10	Guide for the nondestructive examination of welds
AWS B2.1	Specification for Welding Procedure and Performance Qualification
AWS D1.1	Structural welding (steel)
AWS D1.2	Structural welding (aluminum)
AWS D1.3	Structural welding (sheet steel)
AWS D1.4	Structural welding (reinforcing steel)
AWS D1.5	Bridge welding
AWS D1.6	Structural welding (stainless steel)
AWS D1.7	Structural welding (strengthening and repair)
AWS D1.8	Structural welding seismic supplement
AWS D1.9	Structural welding (titanium)
AWS D3.6R	Underwater welding (Offshore & inland pipelines)
AWS D8.1	Automotive spot welding
AWS D8.6	Automotive spot welding electrodes supplement
AWS D8.7	Automotive spot welding recommendations supplement
AWS D8.8	Automotive arc welding (steel)
AWS D8.9	Automotive spot weld testing
AWS D8.14	Automotive arc welding (aluminum)
AWS D9.1	Sheet metal welding
AWS D10.10	Heating practices for pipe and tube
AWS D10.11	Root pass welding for pipe
AWS D10.12	Pipe welding (mild steel)
AWS D10.13	Tube brazing (copper)
AWS D10.18	Pipe welding (stainless steel)
AWS D11.2	Welding (cast iron)
AWS D14.1	Industrial mill crane welding
AWS D14.3	Earthmoving & agricultural equipment welding
AWS D14.4	Machinery joint welding
AWS D14.5	Press welding
AWS D14.6	Rotating Elements of Equipment
AWS D14.9	Specification for the Welding of Hydraulic Cylinders
AWS D15.1	Railroad welding
AWS D15.2	Railroad welding practice supplement
AWS D16.1	Robotic arc welding safety
AWS D16.2	Robotic arc welding system installation
AWS D16.3	Robotic arc welding risk assessment
AWS D16.4	Robotic arc welder operator qualification
AWS D17.1	Aerospace fusion welding
AWS D17.2	Aerospace resistance welding
AWS D17.3	Aerospace friction stir welding (aluminum)
AWS D18.1	Hygienic tube welding (stainless steel)
AWS D18.2	Stainless steel tube discoloration guide
AWS D18.3	Hygienic equipment welding

== American Petroleum Institute (API) Standards ==
The American Petroleum Institute (API) oldest and most successful programs is in the development of API standards which started with its first standard in 1924. API maintains over 500 standards covering the oil and gas field. The following is a partial list specific to welding:

Standard Number	Description
API RP 577	Welding Inspection and Metallurgy
API RP 582	Welding Guidelines for the Chemical, Oil, and Gas Industries
API 1104	Welding of pipelines and related facilities
API 1169	Basic Inspection Requirements for New Pipeline Construction

== Australian / New Zealand (AS/NZS) Standards ==
Standards Australia is the body responsible for the development, maintenance and publication of Australian Standards. The following is a partial list specific to welding:

Standard Number	Description
AS/NZS 1554.1	Structural steel welding - Welding of steel structures
AS/NZS 1554.2	Structural steel welding - Stud welding (steel studs to steel)
AS/NZS 1554.3	Structural steel welding - Welding of reinforcing steel
AS/NZS 1554.4	Structural steel welding - Welding of high strength quenched and tempered steels
AS/NZS 1554.5	Structural steel welding - Welding of steel structures subject to high levels of fatigue loading
AS/NZS 1554.6	Structural steel welding - Welding stainless steels for structural purposes
AS/NZS 1554.7	Structural steel welding - Welding of sheet steel structures
AS/NZS 3992	Pressure equipment - Welding and brazing qualification
AS/NZS 4855	Welding consumables - Covered electrodes for manual metal arc welding
AS 4041	Pressure Piping

== Canadian Standards Association (CSA) Standards ==
The Canadian Standards Association (CSA) is responsible for the development, maintenance and publication of CSA standards. The following is a partial list specific to welding:

Standard Number	Description
CAN/CSA-G401-14	Corrugated steel pipe products
CAN/CSA-ISO 14341:11 (R2016)	Welding consumables - Wire electrodes and weld deposits for gas shielded metal arc welding of non alloy and fine grain steels - Classification
CAN/CSA-W117.2-12	Safety in welding, cutting, and allied processes
G40.20-13/G40.21-13	General requirements for rolled or welded structural quality steel/ Structural quality steel
W178.1-14	Certification of welding inspection organizations
W178.2-14	Certification of welding inspectors
W47.1-09 (R2014)	Certification of companies for fusion welding of steel
W47.2-11 (R2015)	Certification of companies for fusion welding of aluminum
W48-14	Filler metals and allied materials for metal arc welding
W55.3-08 (R2013)	Certification of companies for resistance welding of steel and aluminum
W59-13	Welded steel construction (metal arc welding)
W59.2-M1991 (R2013)	Welded Aluminum Construction
CAN/CSA-Z662-15	Oil and gas pipeline systems

== British Standards (BS) ==
British Standards are developed, maintained and published by BSI Standards which is UK's National Standards Body. The following is a partial list of standards specific to welding:

Standard Number	Description
BS 499-1	Welding terms and symbols. Glossary for welding, brazing and thermal cutting
BS 499-2C	Welding terms and symbols. European arc welding symbols in chart form
BS 2633	Specification for Class I arc welding of ferritic steel pipework for carrying fluids
BS 2971	Specification for class II arc welding of carbon steel pipework for carrying fluids
BS 4515-1	Specification for welding of steel pipelines on land and offshore - Part 1: Carbon and carbon manganese steel pipelines
BS 4515-2	Specification for welding of steel pipelines on land and offshore. Duplex stainless steel pipelines
PD 6705-2	Structural use of steel and aluminium. Recommendations for the execution of steel bridges to BS EN 1090-2
PD 6705-3	Structural use of steel and aluminium. Recommendations for the execution of aluminium structures to BS EN 1090-3

== International Organization for Standardization (ISO) Standards ==
International Organization for Standardization (ISO) has developed over 18500 standards and over 1100 new standards are published every year. The following is a partial list of the standards specific to welding:

Standard Number	Description
ISO 2553	Welded, brazed and soldered joints - symbolic representation on drawings (1992)
ISO 2560	Welding consumables. Covered electrodes for manual metal arc welding of non-alloy and fine grain steels. Classification
ISO 3580	Covered electrodes for manual arc welding of creep-resisting steels - Code of symbols for identification
ISO 3581	Covered electrodes for manual arc welding of stainless and other similar high alloy steels - Code of symbols for identification
ISO 3834	Quality requirements for fusion welding of metallic materials, five parts.
ISO 4063	Welding and allied processes - Nomenclature of processes and reference numbers
ISO 5817	Welding. Fusion-welded joints in steel, nickel, titanium and their alloys (beam welding excluded). Quality levels for imperfections
ISO 6520-1	Welding and allied processes — Classification of geometric imperfections in metallic materials — Part 1: Fusion welding
ISO 6520-2	Welding and allied processes — Classification of geometric imperfections in metallic materials — Part 2: Welding with pressure
ISO 6947	Welds. Working positions. Definitions of angles of slope and rotation
ISO 9606	Qualification test of welders — Fusion welding, parts 1 to 5
ISO 9692-1	Welding and allied processes. Recommendations for joint preparation. Manual metal-arc welding, gas-shielded metal-arc welding, gas welding, TIG welding and beam welding of steels
ISO 9692-2	Welding and allied processes. Joint preparation. Submerged arc welding of steels
ISO 9692-3	Welding and allied processes. Joint preparation. Part 3: TIG and MIG welding of aluminium and its alloys
ISO 9692-4	Welding and allied processes. Joint preparation. Part 4: Clad steels
ISO 13847	Petroleum and natural gas industries - Pipeline transportation systems - Welding of pipelines
ISO 13916	Welding - Guidance on the measurement of preheating temperature, interpass temperature and preheat maintenance temperature
ISO 13918	Welding - Studs and ceramic ferrules for arc stud welding
ISO 13919-1	Welding - Electron and laser-beam welded joints - Guidance on quality level for imperfections - Part 1: Steel
ISO 13919-2	Welding - Electron and laser-beam welded joints - Guidance on quality level for imperfections - Part 2: Aluminium and its weldable alloys
ISO 13920	Welding - General tolerances for welded constructions - Dimensions for lengths and angles - Shape and position
ISO 14112	Gas welding equipment - Small kits for gas brazing and welding
ISO 14175	Welding consumables — Gases and gas mixtures for fusion welding and allied processes. Replaced EN 439:1994 in Europe.
ISO 14341	Welding consumables. Wire electrodes and deposits for gas shielded metal arc welding of non alloy and fine grain steels. Classification
ISO 14554	Resistance welding
ISO 14744	Electron beam welding, six parts
ISO 15607	Specification and qualification of welding procedures for metallic materials - General rules
ISO/TR 15608	Welding - Guidelines for a metallic material grouping system
ISO 15609	Specification and qualification of welding procedures for metallic materials - Welding procedure specification, five parts.
ISO 15610	Specification and qualification of welding procedures for metallic materials — Qualification based on tested welding consumables
ISO 15611	Specification and qualification of welding procedures for metallic materials — Qualification based on previous welding experience
ISO 15612	Specification and qualification of welding procedures for metallic materials — Qualification by adoption of a standard welding procedure
ISO 15613	Specification and qualification of welding procedures for metallic materials — Qualification based on pre-production welding test
ISO 15614	Specification and qualification of welding procedures for metallic materials - Welding procedure test, 13 parts.
ISO 15615	Gas welding equipment. Acetylene manifold systems for welding, cutting and allied processes. Safety requirements in high-pressure devices
ISO 15618-1	Qualification testing of welders for under-water welding. Diver-welders for hyperbaric wet welding
ISO 15618-2	Qualification testing of welders for under-water welding. Diver-welders and welding operators for hyperbaric dry welding
ISO 17635	Non-destructive testing of welds. General rules for metallic materials
ISO 17660-1	Welding - Welding of reinforcing steel - Part 1: Load-bearing welded joints
ISO 17660-2	Welding - Welding of reinforcing steel - Part 1: Non-load bearing welded joints
ISO/TR 20172	Welding — Grouping systems for materials — European materials
ISO/TR 20173	Welding — Grouping systems for materials — American materials
ISO/TR 20174	Welding — Grouping systems for materials — Japanese materials
ISO 24394	Welding for aerospace applications. Qualification test for welders and welding operators. Fusion welding of metallic components

== European Union (CEN) standards ==
The European Committee for Standardization (CEN) had issued numerous standards covering welding processes, which unified and replaced former national standards. Of the former national standards, those issued by BSI and DIN were widely used outside their countries of origin. After the Vienna Agreement with ISO, CEN has replaced most of them with equivalent ISO standards (EN ISO series).

Standard Number	Description
EN 287-1	Qualification test of welders — Fusion welding — Part 1: Steels. Withdrawn and replaced by EN ISO 9606-1 (Note: The 2004 version of this CEN standard was introduced in place of ISO 9606-1, which was not accepted by the ISO committee due to reactions by USA and Canada.)
EN 1090-1	Execution of steel structures and aluminium structures - Part 1: Requirements for conformity assessment of structural components
EN 1090-2	Execution of steel structures and aluminium structures - Part 2: Technical requirements for steel structures
EN 1090-3	Execution of steel structures and aluminium structures - Part 3: Technical requirements for aluminium structures
EN 1011-1	Welding — Recommendations for welding of metallic materials — Part 1: General guidance for arc welding
EN 1011-2	Welding — Recommendations for welding of metallic materials — Part 2: Arc welding of ferritic steels
EN 1011-3	Welding — Recommendations for welding of metallic materials — Part 3: Arc welding of stainless steels
EN 1011-4	Welding — Recommendations for welding of metallic materials — Part 4: Arc welding of aluminium and aluminium alloys
EN 1011-5	Welding. Recommendations for welding of metallic materials. Welding of clad steel
EN 1011-6	Welding. Recommendations for welding of metallic materials. Laser beam welding
EN 1011-7	Welding — Recommendations for welding of metallic materials — Part 7: Electron beam welding
EN 1011-8	Welding. Recommendations for welding of metallic materials. Welding of cast irons
EN 1418	Welding personnel. Approval testing of welding operators for fusion welding and resistance weld setters for fully mechanized and automatic welding of metallic materials. (CEN version of ISO 14732)
EN 1708-1	Welding. Basic welded joint details in steel. Pressurized components.
EN 1708-2	Welding. Basic weld joint details in steel. Non-internal pressurized components.
EN 1708-3	Welding. Basic weld joint details in steel. Clad, buttered and lined pressurized components.
EN 1993-1-8	Eurocode 3: Design of steel structures – Part 1-8: General – Design of joints
EN 13133	Brazing - Brazer approval
EN 22553	Welded, brazed and soldered joints – Symbolic representation on drawings. (CEN version of ISO 2553)

Additional requirements for welding exist in CEN codes and standards for specific products, like EN 12952, EN 12953, EN 13445, EN 13480, etc.

== German Standards (DIN and others) ==
NA 092 is the Standards Committee for welding and allied processes (NAS) at DIN Deutsches Institut für Normung e. V. The following is a partial list of DIN welding standards:

Code	Description
DIN 1910-100	Welding; terms dependent on materials for metal welding
SEW 088	Schweißgeeignete Feinkornbaustähle - Richtlinien für die Verarbeitung besonders für das Schmelzschweißen, Stahlinstitut VDEh
Merkblatt DVS 0916	Metall-Schutzgasschweißen von Feinkornbaustählen, Deutscher Verband für Schweißtechnik e.V.

== Japanese Standards (JIS and others) ==
=== Japanese Industrial Standards (JIS) ===
Japanese Industrial Standards are the standards used for industrial activities in Japan, coordinated by the Japanese Industrial Standards Committee (JISC) and published by the Japanese Standards Association (JSA).

- JIS Z 3001-1 Welding and allied processes-Vocabulary-Part 1: General
- JIS Z 3001-2 Welding and allied processes-Vocabulary-Part 2: Welding processes
- JIS Z 3001-3 Welding and allied processes-Vocabulary-Part 3: Soldering and brazing
- JIS Z 3001-4 Welding and allied processes-Vocabulary-Part 4: Imperfections in welding
- JIS Z 3001-5 Welding and allied processes-Vocabulary-Part 5: Laser welding
- JIS Z 3001-6 Welding and allied processes-Vocabulary-Part 6: Resistance welding
- JIS Z 3001-7 Welding and allied processes-Vocabulary-Part 7: Arc welding
- JIS Z 3011 Welding positions defined by means of angles of slope and rotation
- JIS Z 3021 Welding and allied processes -- Symbolic representation

=== Japan Welding Society Standard (WES) ===
As a WES standard, it is defined in the following classification.

1. Fundamentals
2. Tests, inspections and their equipment
3. Base material
4. welding material
5. Welding and cutting equipment and accessories
6. Welding design and construction
7. Welding-related certifications and certifications
8. Safety, health and environment

== See also ==
- Welding
- List of welding processes
- Welder certification
- Welding Procedure Specification
- Welder

== Further reading and external links ==
- Overview poster of CEN & ISO welding standards
