= Comfort A. Adams =

American electrical engineer (1868–1958)

Comfort Avery Adams
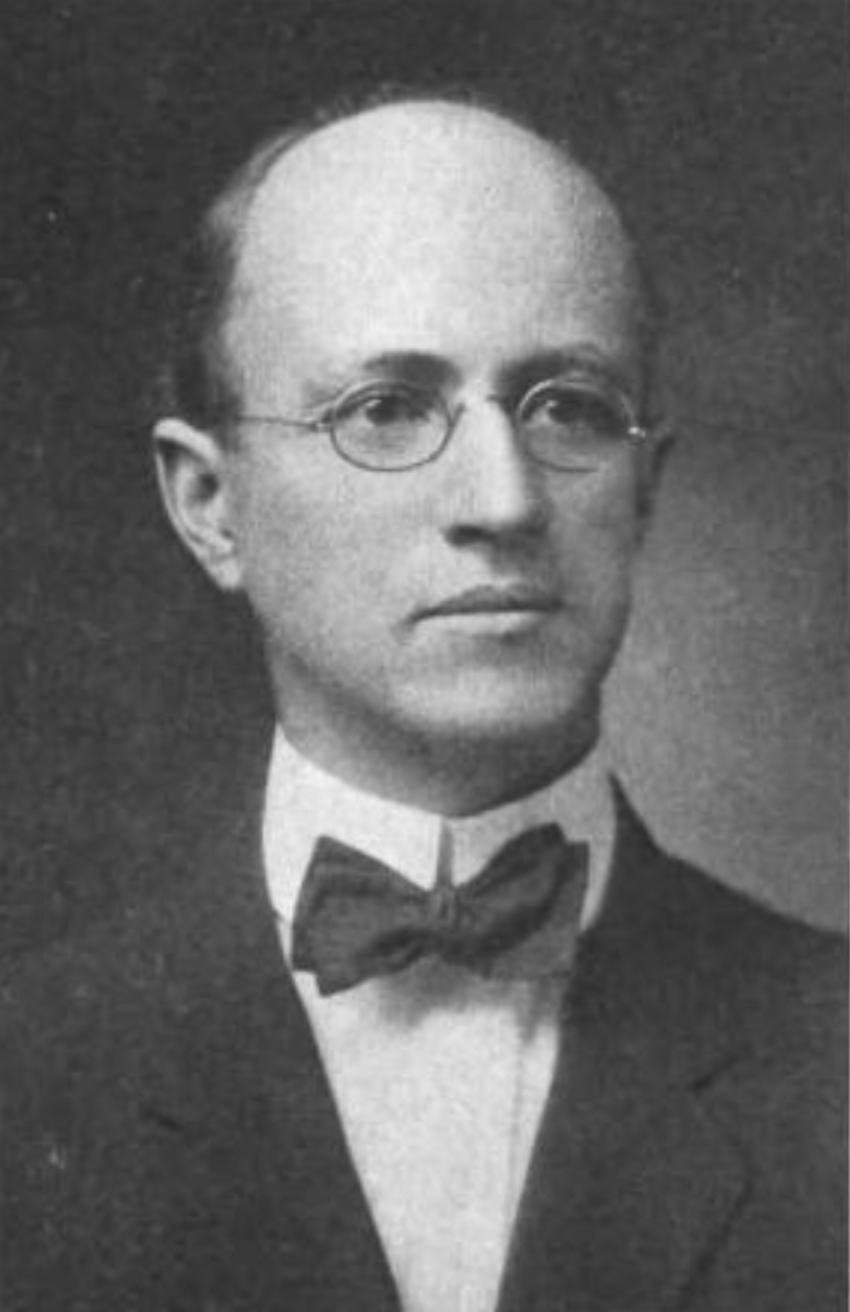
- Adams in 1915
- Born: November 1, 1868; Cleveland, Ohio, U.S.
- Died: February 21, 1958 (aged 89); Philadelphia, Pennsylvania, U.S.
- Education: Case School of Applied Science
- Occupation: Electrical engineer
- Awards: IEEE Edison Medal (1956)
- Scientific career
- Fields: Electrical engineering

Comfort Avery Adams (November 1, 1868 – February 21, 1958) was an American electrical engineer who as a student helped Albert A. Michelson with the Michelson–Morley experiment (1887), which was later viewed as confirming the special relativity theory of Albert Einstein (1905). He was a recipient of the IEEE Edison Medal and AIEE Lamme Medal.

== Biography ==
Adams was born in Cleveland, Ohio, to Comfort Avery Adams Sr. and Katherine Emily Peticolas on November 1, 1868.

"Doc Adams", as he was commonly addressed by his colleagues and friends, received his Honorary Doctorate of Engineering from his alma mater, Case School of Applied Science, in 1925 after having been on the faculty at Harvard College and dean of their engineering school for almost 35 years. He later received his second honorary doctorate from Lehigh University in 1939. By that time, he had retired from Harvard. In terms of an all-around American engineer in the early 20th century, Adams comes the closest to being America's answer to Britain's I. K. Brunel.

Adams was president of the American Institute of Electrical Engineers and the American Welding Society. He organized and chaired the Welding Research Council.

Adams married Elizabeth Chassis Parsons in 1894, and they adopted two children. Adams died at his home in Philadelphia, Pennsylvania, on February 21, 1958, aged 89.

== Honors and awards ==
- Fellow of the American Academy of Arts and Sciences (1906)
- Honorary Doctor of Engineering from Case School of Applied Science 1925
- Honorary Doctor of Engineering from Lehigh University (1939)
- Lamme Medalist of the American Institute of Electrical Engineers (1940)
- IEEE Edison Medal (1956)
- Delivered the first of the series of Adams Lectures founded in his honor by the American Welding Society
- Samuel Wylie Miller Medal of the American Welding Society (first recipient)
- Long-time member of the ASME Boiler and Pressure Vessel Committee, then Honorary Member
- Honorary Member of the International Acetylene Association
- Member of the National Academy of Sciences

== Memberships ==
- American Institute of Electrical Engineers
- American Society of Mechanical Engineers
- American Society of Civil Engineers
- American Standards Association
- American Engineering Council
- American Society for Metals
- American Society for Testing and Materials
- Society for Promotion of Engineering Education
- American Physical Society
- British Institute of Electrical Engineering
- Verband Deutscher Electrotechniker
- Société Française des Electriciens
- Sigma Xi
- Tau Beta Pi

== Club memberships ==
- Harvard Faculty Club, Cambridge, Massachusetts
- Engineers Club, New York
- Engineers' Club of Philadelphia
- Cedarbrook Country Club, Blue Bell, Pennsylvania
