= Everything Will Work Out Right =

Studio album by Morgan Finlay
- Released: 2005
- Genre: Pop

Morgan Finlay chronology
Uppercut (2002)	Everything Will Work Out Right (2005)	Shifting Through the Breakers (2007)

Everything Will Work Out Right is the debut album by Canadian singer and songwriter Morgan Finlay. It was released in 2005.

== Track listing ==
1. "Inside"
2. "Zensong"
3. "The Reason Why"
4. "The Way It Is"
5. "Wait in Measures"
6. "Flow"
7. "Everything Will Work Out Right"
8. "514"
9. "Why Georgia"
10. "In a Perfect World"
11. "Far Beyond Words"
12. "Seattle"
