= The Word of a Gentleman =

The Word of a Gentleman (1981) (later retitled Undercut) was the third of five novels written by Peter Niesewand, the South African journalist who spent 73 days in solitary confinement for his coverage of Ian Smith's government in Rhodesia (now Zimbabwe). Set in the fictional former British colony of St David's Island, it has no principal protagonists beyond the corrupt trio of Claud Montrose, Alec Clifton, and Stephen Luther, but the subversive influence of the American agent Clive Lyle is progressively revealed as the story unfolds. The fate of the unjustly imprisoned Stephen Ayer and his wife Nora are the focus of many chapters (and the book opens with a quotation from Oscar Wilde's The Ballad of Reading Gaol); these reflect Niesewand's detention by Desmond Lardner-Burke under P. K. van der Byl and Smith, and his subsequent deportation, leaving behind his wife of three years, Nonie Niesewand (née Fogarty).
