= Uppercut (EP) =

EP by Morgan Finlay
- Released: 2002
- Genre: Pop

Morgan Finlay chronology
Uppercut (2002)	Everything Will Work Out Right (2005)

Uppercut is an EP by Canadian singer and songwriter Morgan Finlay. It was released in 2002.

== Track listing ==
1. "Zensong"
2. "In a Perfect World"
3. "The Reason Why"
4. "A Lesson"
5. "Flow"
6. "Everything Will Work Out Right"
