= AS/NZS 1200 =

Standard for pressure equipment in Australia and New Zealand

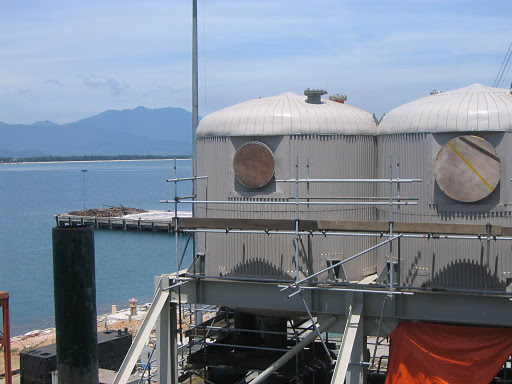
Vertical pressure vessels installed in a structure on their way to Australia to a mining plant

The AS/NZS 1200 standard is a joint Australian/New Zealand Standard, for the requirements of pressure equipment which aims to promote safety and uniformity throughout Australia and New Zealand.

== History ==
This standard was originally published in 1931 as CB1 - SAA Boiler Code. It was subsequently issued in 1963 and 1967. In 1972, the standard was issued under the designation AS 1200. The 2nd, 3rd and 4th editions were published in 1978, 1981 and 1988 respectively. In 1994 the standard was revised and issued under the designation AS/NZS 1200. The latest and 6th edition was published in 2000.

== Requirements and Compliance ==
Equipment to be used in Australia or New Zealand must meet the following requirements:

- Compliance with the Standards listed in this Standard, including international Standards, or those equivalently agreed between all parties.
- Compliance with all applicable legal jurisdictions.
- Compliance with the contract documents.

When a selected Standard is used (local or international) as listed in this Standard, it shall be used in its entirety except when compliance with more appropriate requirements of other Standards. Irrespective of the Standard used, the Standard should only be considered as the minimal requirements and not necessarily holistic, therefore judgement needs to be exercised to ensure all relevant matters are covered.

== Pressure Equipment Standards ==
AS/NZS 1200 is a 'parent' Standard that specifies the requirements and Standards specific to pressure equipment. The following provides a sample of some of the Standards applicable to pressure equipment under this Standard.

Function	Equipment / Action	Standard
General	General Requirements	AS/NZS 1200
General	Hazard levels	AS 4343
Construction	Boilers	AS 1228
Construction	Pressure Vessels - General	AS 1210–2010
Construction	Pressure Vessels - Advanced Design	AS 1210–2010
Construction	Pressure Vessels - Cold-stretched Austenitic Stainless Steel Vessels	AS 1210–2010
Construction	Pressure Piping - General	AS 4041
Construction	Manufacturing	AS 4458
Construction	Welding and Brazing Qualifications	AS/NZS 3992
Construction	Examination and Testing	AS 4037
Construction	Installation	AS 3892
Use	In-service Inspections	AS/NZS 3788
Use	Inspections	AS 3873

== Conformity Assessment ==
=== Australia ===
National

Pressure equipment is to be in accordance with AS/NZS 1200 per the Australian Government legislation as stipulated in Regulations 4.05(2)(d) and 4.51 (4)(b) of the Occupational Health and Safety (Safety Standards) Regulations 1994.

Queensland

Some pressure equipment (excluding pressure piping) is regulated in the state of Queensland as per Schedule 4 (13) of the Workplace Health and Safety Regulation 2008. In this Schedule, it refers to certain criteria being met per AS 4343, which scope is to classify hazard levels of pressure equipment to AS/NZS 1200.

New South Wales

Pressure equipment is regulated in the state of New South Wales as per Clause 94 (a) of the Occupational Health and Safety Regulation 2001. This Clause refers to AS 4343 and AS 1210, which are main Standards referenced in the 'parent' Standard AS/NZS 1200.

=== New Zealand ===
Pressure equipment is to be in accordance with AS/NZS 1200 under New Zealand legislation as stipulated in section 3.4.1(1) of the Approved Code of Practice (ACOP) for Pressure Equipment (Excluding Boilers). This ACOP supports the requirements of the Health and Safety in Employment (Pressure Equipment, Cranes and Passenger Ropeways) Regulations 1999.
