= Peter Niesewand =

South African writer and journalist (1944–1983)

Peter Joseph Niesewand (30 June 1944 – 4 February 1983), journalist and novelist, was born in South Africa but grew up in Rhodesia where he ran a news bureau, filing for the BBC, United Press, AFP, and many newspapers, notably The Guardian. On 20 February 1973 he was arrested and spent 73 days in solitary confinement for his criticism of conditions under Ian Smith's government and his coverage of the guerrilla war. His sentence of two years hard labour for revealing official secrets was commuted on appeal after an international outcry. He was deported on release from prison, and left with his wife of three years, Nonie, and young son Oliver. He emigrated to the United Kingdom to complete his only non-fiction book, "In Camera: Secret Justice in Rhodesia", and was named 1973 International Journalist of the Year, an award he won again in 1976 for his coverage of the Lebanese civil war, again for the Guardian. As their Asia correspondent he also covered the 1979 Soviet invasion of Afghanistan from on the ground, experiences that inform his last novel, Scimitar. He subsequently returned to London to become their deputy news editor until his untimely death of a heart attack at the age of 38.

Niesewand is credited by Colin Smith in Carlos - Portrait of a Terrorist for originating terrorist Ilich Ramírez Sánchez's 'Jackal' alias:

The nickname the Guardian reporter Peter Niesewand had inspired by mentioning the Forsyth thriller found along with the arms cache in Angela Otaola's bedsit was a perfect fit. Derogatory yet with just a hint of admiration for the cunning of the canine sometimes known as "the lion's provider".

== Works ==
- In Camera; Secret Justice in Rhodesia. Weidenfeld & Nicolson. 1973. ISBN 9780297766766.

Besides journalism and non-fiction Niesewand also wrote five novels:

- The Underground Connection. Secker and Warburg. 1978. ISBN 978-0-8128-3048-4.
- A Member of the Club. London: Secker and Warburg. 1979. ISBN 0436310201. OL 4484997M.
- The Word of a Gentleman. Secker and Warburg. 1981. ISBN 043631021X., republished (after the success of Fallback) as Undercut. Panther. 1984. ISBN 978-0-586-05626-4.,
- Fallback. New American Library. 1983. ISBN 978-0-451-12053-3. and
- Scimitar. Granada. 1983. ISBN 978-0-451-13905-4.
