= Canadian Welding Bureau =

Canadian non-profit organization

CWB Group
- CWB Corporate Logo
- Abbreviation: CWB Group
- Formation: 1947
- Type: Profitable
- Purpose: Public Safety, Welding Certification, Training, Membership, Education
- Headquarters: 8260 Parkhill Drive, Milton, Ontario, L9T 5V7
- Leader: Interim CEO David Collie
- Key people: J. Craig Martin (Chief Operating Officer); Michael Stewart (Chief Financial Officer); Trent Konrad (VP - Business Development); Matt Aiton (VP - Marketing); Inderpal S. Jaswal (Registrar and Director - Quality Assurance)
- Parent organization: CWB Group - Industry Services
- Website: http://www.cwbgroup.org/ https://education.cwbgroup.org/

The CWB Group exists to empower the welding and joining community, offering a complete suite of solutions to help you succeed. The CWB Group offers Certification, Education, Registration, Consulting, and Membership services that provide the expertise, training, and resources you need to overcome obstacles and achieve your goals.

The CWB Group is headquartered in Ontario, Canada, our reach spans 45 countries, serving over 10,000 companies worldwide. As an accredited Certification Body under the Standards Council of Canada, we administer the Canadian Standards Association's welding standards with precision and care. Our purpose beyond certification—we aim to elevate the global standards of welding performance, education, and safety, ensuring reliable and durable results in every weld.

- Certification of companies involved in welding
- Certification of Welding Inspection Companies
- Certification of Welding Inspectors
- Certification of Welding Electrodes

== What we do ==
Certify Excellence: We provide mandatory and voluntary welding certifications that meet national and international standards, ensuring compliance.

Educate the Welding Industry: We train the next generation of welders, inspectors, and engineers using cutting-edge tools to enhance welding education across Canada.

Register Quality: CWB Group specializes in quality management and ISO registration, tailoring solutions for industries ranging from shipbuilding to structural steel and beyond.

Consult with Experts: Our consulting team delivers targeted, code-compliant solutions to optimize your welding performance and achieve your goals.

Foster Community: The CWB Association unites over 70,000 members, building a network of support, knowledge-sharing, and advocacy for the welding industry.

== Authorized National Body (ANB) Status ==
The CWB is the Authorized National Body (ANB) in Canada for the International Institute of Welding (IIW) and is authorized to issue diplomas under the IWP, IWS, IWT and IWE programs. In addition, the CWB is the Authorized National Body for Company Certification (ANBCC) for the IIW providing certification services under ISO 3834.

== CWB Group Services ==
CWB Group qualifies welders, welding inspectors, welding supervisors, welding engineers, NDT Technicians, and welding electrodes/consumables. The activity of tCWB Group ontributes to the high level of competence enjoyed by industries employing welding and joining and the consistent progress in welding technology, and the reliability of welded products.

== CWB Office of Public Safety ==
CWB QualityMark

In April 2013, the CWB Office of Public Safety was launched by CWB Group. A key mandate of the CWB is to enhance public safety through ensuring high quality and reliable welded structures. To support this mandate, the Office of Public Safety developed the "WeldQuality Mark" to allow companies that meet the stringent requirements of CWB Certification programs to use a visible indicator of their commitment to quality and safety though the mark. The Office of Public Safety also maintains a unique web site that provides information and resources for the public, industry and government as well as the ability to request investigations around enforcement issues. The Office of Public Safety also provides resources to provide representation on key Canadian, American and International welding standard technical committees to ensure Canadian requirements and leadership in the area of welding standards is maintained.

== Canadian Welding Association (CWA) ==
The Canadian Welding Association (CWA) has been in existence since the early 1920s. The CWA became part of the CWB Group in May 2008, and currently has a membership of over 36,000 individuals. Dan Tadic is currently the Director of the CWA. Membership in the CWA is open to welding professionals, fabricators, and manufacturers. The CWA has 24 local chapters across Canada, which provides a venue for local volunteers to promote the Association's goals of educating companies and their employees, improving productivity, profitability and safety in Canada's welding industry. The CWA also provides a national voice for the welding industry in Canada, communicating its message to both Federal and Provincial Government.
