= Undercut (welding) =

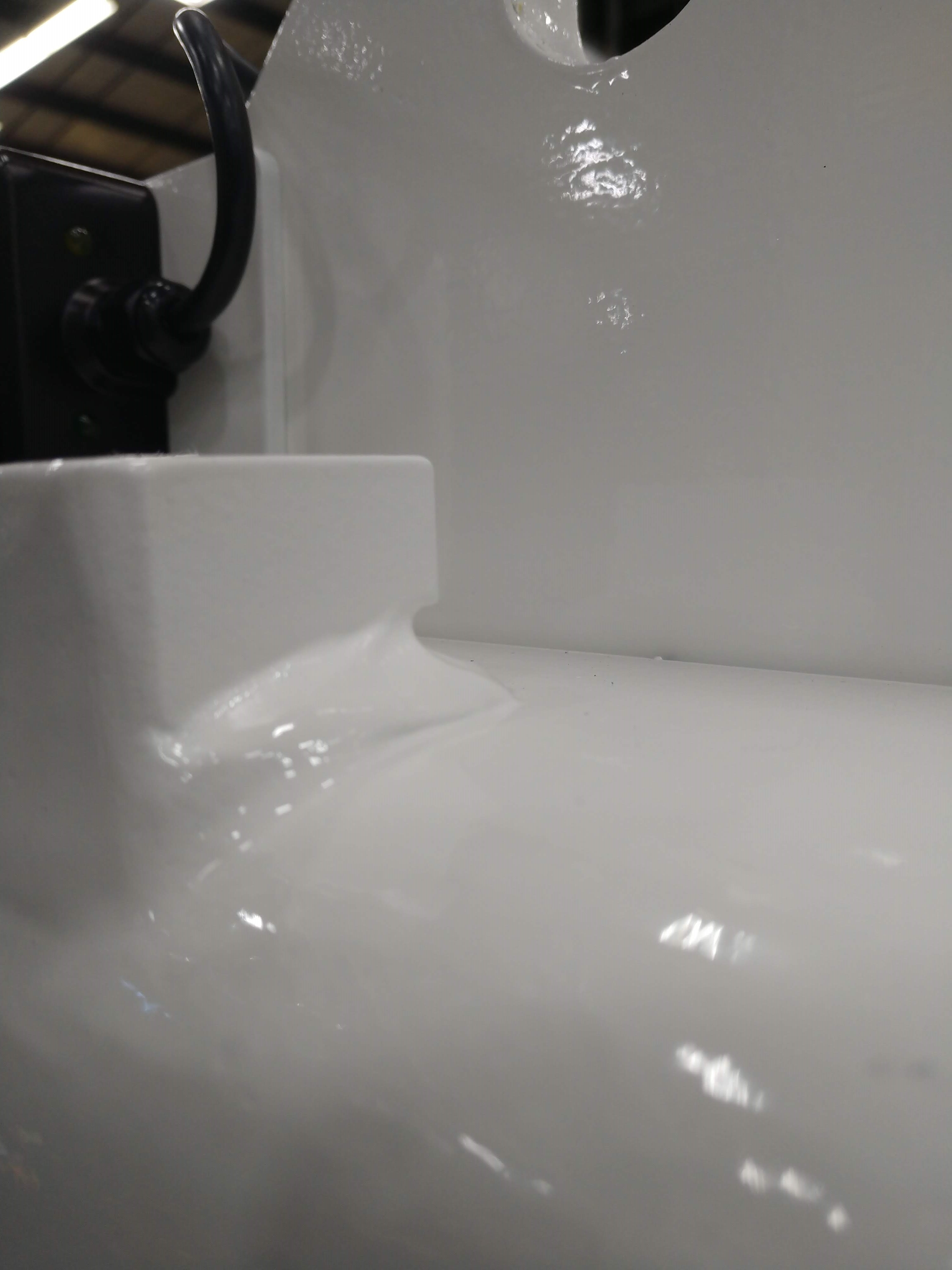
Undercut created during welding

In welding, undercutting is when the weld reduces the cross-sectional thickness of the base metal. This type of defect reduces the strength of the weld and workpieces. One reason for this defect is excessive current, causing the edges of the joint to melt and drain into the weld; this leaves a drain-like impression along the length of the weld. Another reason is if a poor technique is used that does not deposit enough filler metal along the edges of the weld. A third reason is using an incorrect filler metal, because it will create greater temperature gradients between the center of the weld and the edges. Other causes include too small of an electrode angle, a dampened electrode, excessive arc length, and slow speed.
