= American Welding Society =

American non-profit organization

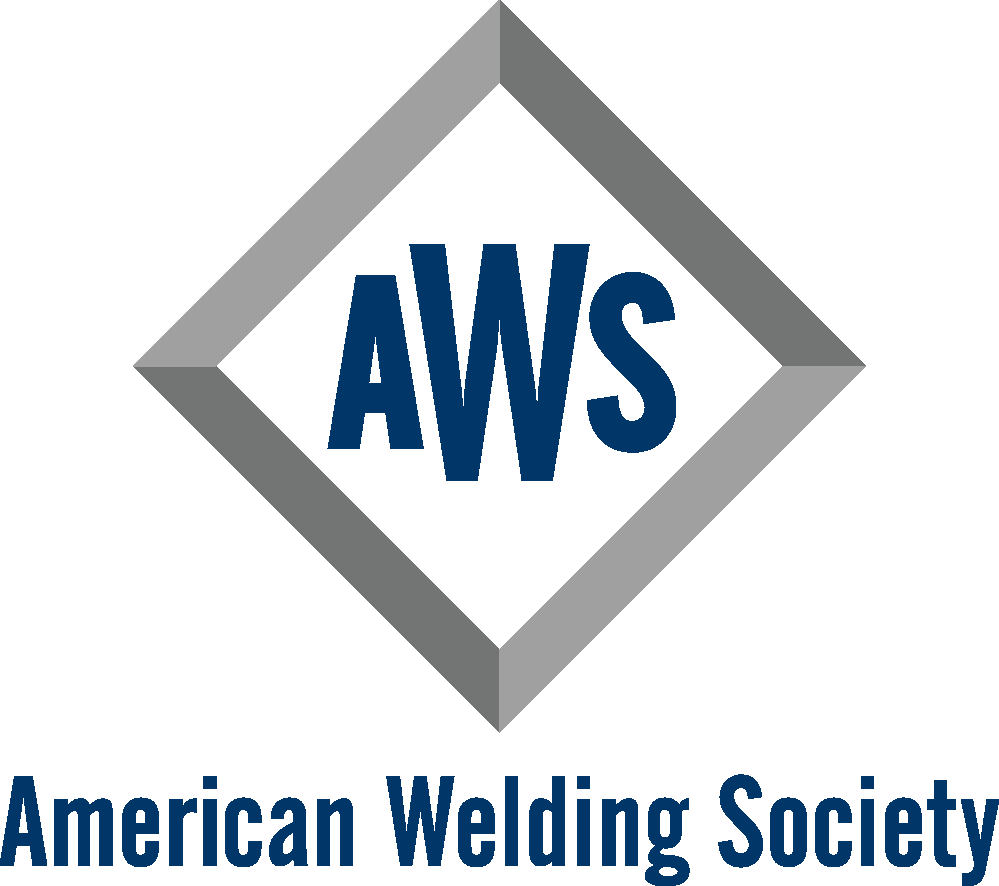
- Founded: 1919; 107 years ago
- Type: Non-Profit Organization
- Headquarters: Doral, FL
- Members: 73,000+
- President: D. Joshua Burgess (2026)
- Website: http://www.aws.org

The American Welding Society (AWS) was founded in 1919 as a non-profit organization to advance the science, technology and application of welding and allied joining and cutting processes, including brazing, soldering and thermal spraying.

Headquartered in Doral, Florida, and led by a volunteer organization of officers and directors, AWS serves over 73,000 members worldwide and is composed of 22 Districts with 250 Sections and student chapters.

== History ==
The roots of the American Welding Society stretch back to World War I, when the sudden demands of swiftly producing military equipment brought about the need for standardization of the manufacturing industry. An evolving metal joining process, welding, suddenly became very necessary to enhance the war effort. To ensure that industry took advantage of this technology, President Woodrow Wilson called upon a Harvard professor, Comfort A. Adams, to chair the Welding Committee of the Emergency Fleet Corp.

Welding performed well in the war effort and its success motivated Adams in 1919 to bring together industry leaders for the purpose of merging the Welding Committee of the Emergency Fleet Corp. and the National Welding Council into a new organization, the purpose of which was to provide dependable and objective information on the developing technology of welding. On March 28, 1919, the American Welding Society was born for that purpose, with Adams serving as its first President.

That first year the Society grew to 217 members; introduced the Journal of the American Welding Society, a technical publication with a life of one issue, but the precursor of the Welding Journal; found a home in the Engineering Societies Building in New York City; and established the foundation of the committee system for the production of its operating procedures and industry standards on welding. In 1920, the first local Section was organized in Philadelphia, Pennsylvania.

By 1922, the American Welding Society had held its first Annual Meeting. Attendees were told of the formation of Sections in eight cities, and also of the establishment of the Journal of the American Welding Society. However, the first meeting also called into discussion the growing financial issues surrounding the depression and proposed solutions to alleviate it. Financial reports delivered at the meeting stated an income for fiscal year ending March 31, 1922, of $12,683.74. The budget for fiscal year 1922-23 was projected at $15,540. It was clear more earnings were needed, so the Society turned to increasing membership numbers of advertising in the Journal as a solution.

=== Location ===
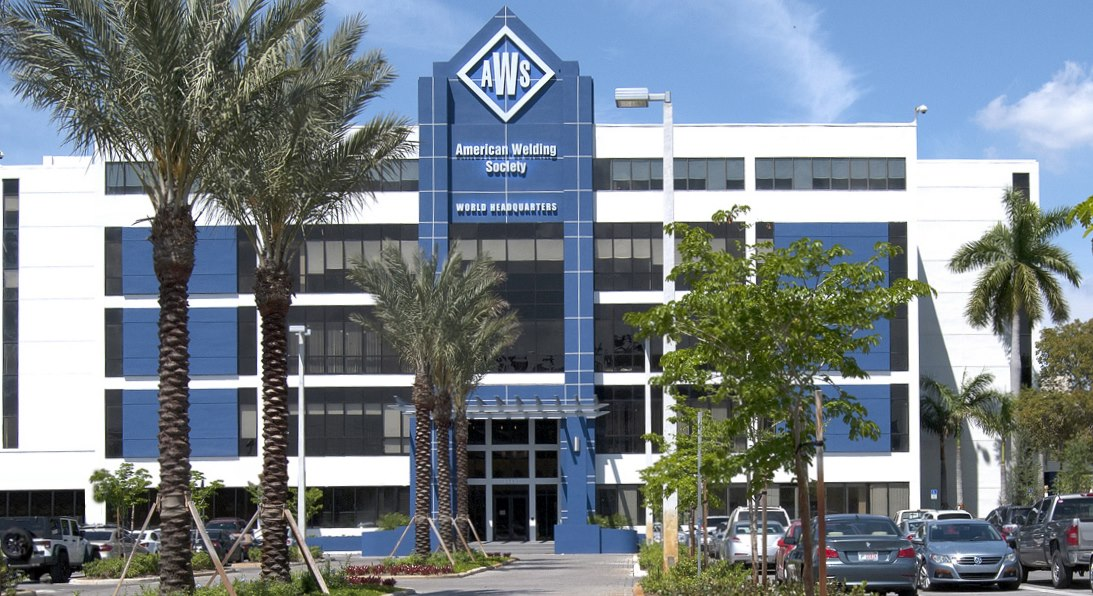
The Doral, FL headquarters for the American Welding Society

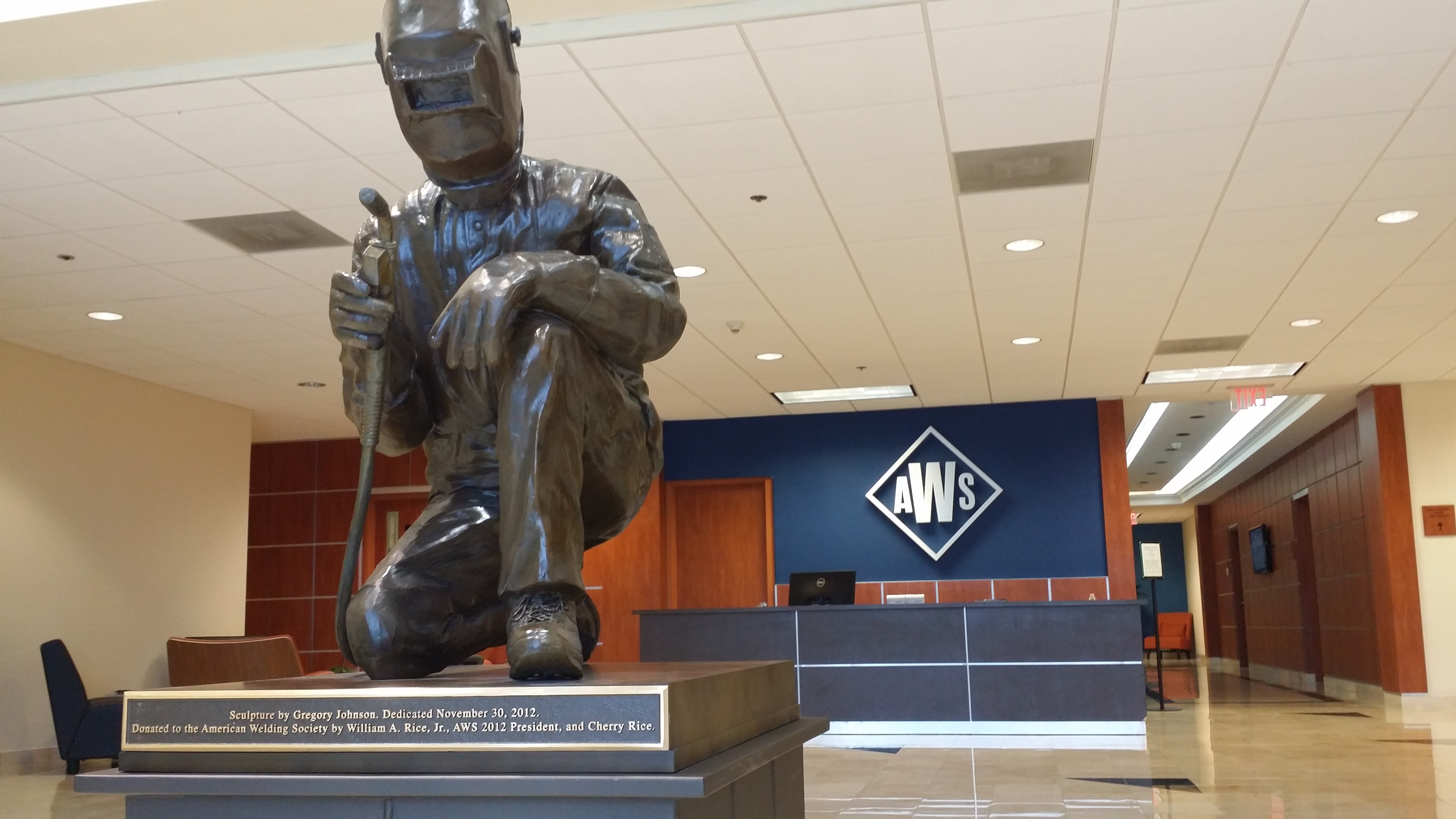
This sculpture sits in the lobby of the American Welding Society headquarters.

The American Welding Society's first headquarters were located in New York City, inside the Engineering Societies' Building. For 42 years the organization held all their business in this building, before finally making the move to the United Engineering Center, which was also in New York City. In 1971 the Society once again moved their headquarters – this time to Miami, Florida. The American Welding Society held this location for 30 years before buying its current property in Doral, Florida – only seven miles northwest of the old facility.

In August 2012 the American Welding Society moved from their longtime headquarters just outside Coral Gables to their current location in Doral. During the grand opening of the new building, AWS President William Rice said "Our newly renovated five-story building in Doral offers us exactly what we need. It gives us more than three times the office and meeting space of our previous headquarters, and it provides room for our board, committee, and educational activities.”

The lobby of the headquarters features a bronze sculpture created by sculptor Gregory Johnson and donated to the American Welding Society by President Rice and his wife Cherry.

== Welding Journal ==
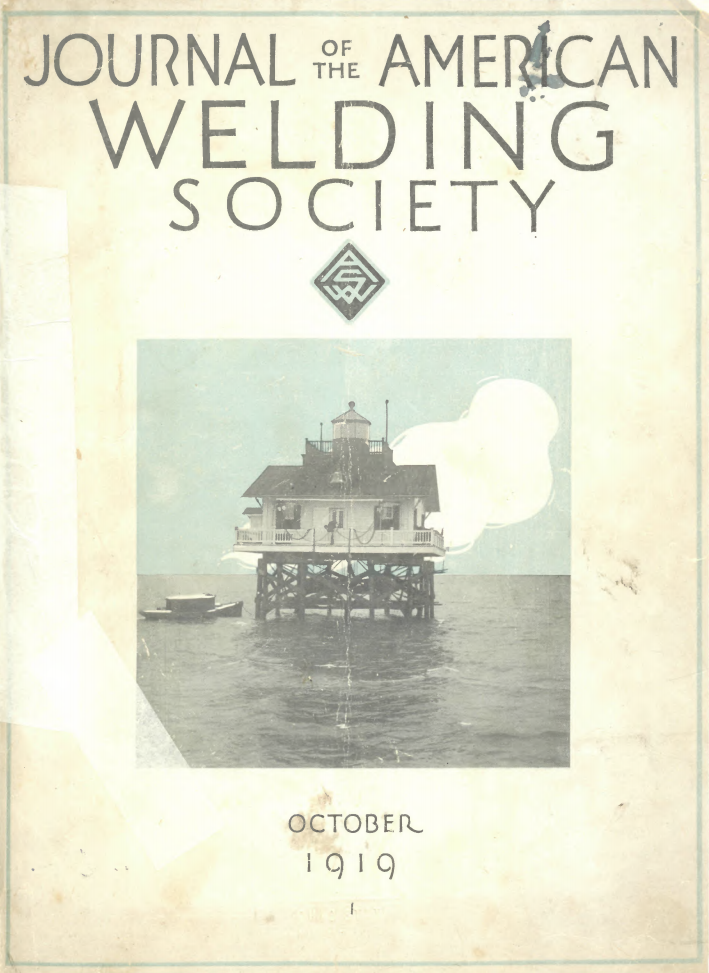
The first and only issue of the Journal of the American Welding Society

The publication currently known as the Welding Journal was born in October 1919 with a different name. The Journal of the American Welding Society was its original title – and it had just one issue under this name. In the first publication, American Welding Society President Comfort A. Adams wrote, "The American Bureau of Welding is the authoritative body to establish the facts. To make the most use of the facts, however, requires another sort of machinery and the organization that does this is the American Welding Society. Its function is not to supply the knowledge but to spread it and assist in putting it to practical uses. It is the Society, for instance, which publishes this Journal, which will push matters of importance to welding and which will open out new fields for its use. It holds regular meetings to discuss matters relating to welding, to act upon the recommendation of the Bureau and to initiate further activities. This division of the work, while it has created some confusion on account of the similarity of the names, is a logical one, and will be found effective in operating as was clearly indicated by the experience with the old Welding Committee."

Operating costs were too high for the Journal, and it was not until 1922 that the publication was reborn under its current name thanks to advertising earnings.

The society explained the advertising move in their first issue of the newly named Welding Journal. "Advertising is also included in this issue, as it was impossible to continue monthly publication without increased revenue. The dues from members of which the National Organization retains half (the other half being returned to local sections) is barely sufficient to pay the ordinary expenses of the Society. Moreover, several members of the Board of Directors feel that these advertisements are of interest to our members and add to the value of the Journal."

Since the move to advertising, the Welding Journal has been published continually and continues to be a resource for issues and advancements concerning all types of materials joining, metal fabrication, and construction. It is offered as a benefit to members of the Society, and includes information of the latest products, trends, technology, and events; including articles covering everything from testing and inspection, maintenance and repair, design, training, personal safety, and brazing and soldering.

The Welding Journal has earned more than 60 editorial and design awards, including multiple Charlie Awards from the Florida Magazine Association (FMA), and Tabbie Awards from the Trade Association Business Publications International (TABPI).

The Society now also publishes the Welding Journal en Español – a free quarterly publication containing tailored articles written by and for Mexican and Latin American professionals. The Welding Journal en Español has a circulation of 10,000 printed copies and 40,000 digital copies. Along with this publication, the Welding Journal em Português is a magazine distributed in Brazil to coincide with the Brazil Welding Show that takes place every two years in São Paulo, Brazil.

== Certification ==
The American Welding Society offers a number of certification programs that recognize and document expertise and knowledge in specific welding-related disciplines, including:

- Certified Welding Inspector
- Senior Certified Welding Inspector
- Certified Welding Educator
- Certified Radiographic Interpreter
- Certified Welding Supervisor
- Certified Welding Sales Representative
- Certified Welding Engineer
- Certified Welder
- Certified Robotic Arc Welding

Since the Certified Welding Inspector (CWI) program was introduced in 1976, AWS has certified over 100,000 welding inspectors alone, plus thousands more working professionals across the other certification categories. Certification is accomplished through testing and evaluation of corresponding procedures. The Radiographic Interpretation Certification, for example, includes a detailed general knowledge exam, a test of specific information from the AWS code book on radiographic quality and interpretation, and a practical exam testing the individual's ability to read radiographic films. Most AWS certifications are typically renewed after a period of three years, and are required to satisfy re-certification requirements every nine years.

Welders are required to take a qualification test at an AWS Accredited Testing Facility. Welders must mail their qualification test record to AWS with a completed AWS Welder Application in order to have an AWS certification issued. AWS Welders are required to submit a Maintenance of Welder Certification Formto renew their certifications every six months.

=== Endorsements ===
Endorsements are supplemental inspection credentials available to all AWS Certified Welding Inspectors (CWIs) and Senior Certified Welding Inspectors (SCWIs) to enhance an individual’s credentials. The examinations offered as endorsements to the CWI/SCWI programs are also offered as stand-alone exams to non-CWIs/SCWIs who wish to enhance their educational background.

Below are the available endorsement certifications that AWS offers as of 2020.

- D1.1 Structural Steel
- D1.2 Structural Aluminum
- D1.5 Welding
- D15.1 Railroad
- D17.1 Aerospace
- API 1104 Pipeline
- Structural Drawing Reading
- Structural Bolting Inspection
- ASME Pressure Piping B31.1 and B31.3
- ASME Pressure Vessel Section VIII, Div. 1

=== Accredited Test Facilities ===
The American Welding Society also certifies the Accredited Test Facilities (ATF) which play an integral part in the operation of their Certification program. The ATF program establishes minimum requirements for test facilities, their personnel and equipment to qualify for accreditation to test and qualify welders. This program is open to all qualified test facilities that may be a part of an independent laboratory, manufacturing plant, educational institution, or other entity. American Welding Society ATFs are listed on the official AWS website and advertised in the American Welding Society's Welding Journal magazine.

The ATF program requires that a facility implements a quality assurance program that meets the requirements established in the AWS QC4-89, Standard for the Accreditation of Testing Facilities. The requirements include that the facility has a Quality Manual that controls the activities related to the testing of welders in the facility according to AWS QC7, Standard for AWS Certified Welders. The facility must also have a CWI on staff or contracted to perform the welder qualification tests.

The American Welding Society explains the benefits of the ATF program on their website by writing "Entrusting welder certification to ATF specialists makes good business sense for contractors and fabricators. Companies are increasingly realizing the shortcomings of self-qualification and switching to AWS Accredited Test Facilities to test and qualify their welders. ATFs help them to save money, improve productivity, and reduce liability by entrusting their welder certification to the experts."

=== Certified Welding Fabricator ===
American Welding Society certifications are not only available to individuals. Companies may also become an official AWS Certified Welding Fabricator (CWF). The American Welding Society describes the program as being "designed to recognize those select companies who prove they have the resources, procedures, and personnel to apply a quality management system to the welding fabrication activities."

The American Institute of Steel Construction (AISC) and the American Welding Society have established a reciprocity agreement whereby AISC Certified Fabricators are also eligible to receive certification as an AWS Certified Welding Fabricator. The AISC certification program criteria fully satisfy the AWS Welding Fabricator Certification program requirements. AISC Fabricators that hold current building structures and/or bridge certification may apply to AWS and pay a minimal fee to also attain the AWS Certified Welding Fabricator certification.

== Membership ==
As of May 2026, the American Welding Society had approximately 63,000 members around the world. The Society offers four types of membership options:

- Individual member
- Welder member
- Corporate member
- Student member

== AWS codes and specifications ==
AWS publishes codes on multiple aspects of welding and materials joining. The code books are assigned specific letters and numbers for easy reference, and many welders will refer to a specific code letter/number combination when referring to the code book. Different welding methodologies, inspection methods, and metals are published under different codes. For example, AWS B1.11 explains how to visually examine welds; AWS B2.1-1-004 explains welding carbon steel of thickness range of 18 through 10 gauge with semiautomatic metal gas arc welding; and AWS C2.20/C2.20M explains metalized zinc cathodic protection systems. Some codes also describe the standards used by AWS to certify welders, inspectors, and welding educators. All codes are available in hard copy, and in recent years AWS has started to make most codes available online.

A very influential AWS code is AWS D1.1, which covers all general requirements for structural welding. This code has been adopted by ANSI as a National Standard in the United States.

== Sections ==
The American Welding Society extends its reach into local communities through the use of their local sections and student chapters. The Society is composed of 250 sections around the world, and AWS describes them as "the very heart and foundation of AWS."

Section members have the opportunity to network, gain knowledge, and get answers to welding questions from Section members with years of experience. Professional Development Hours may be earned by attending technical meetings, and other planned activities may include educational seminars, plant tours, social events, student programs, community projects and more.

=== List of American Welding Society sections ===
List of section in USA
Section name	Section number	City
Acadiana	Section 148	Lafayette, LA
Alaska	Section 125	Anchorage, AK
Arizona	Section 55	Phoenix, AZ
Arrowhead	Section 131	Duluth, MN
Atlanta	Section 25	Atlanta, GA
Auburn–Opelika	Section 508	Auburn, AL
Baton Rouge	Section 86	Baton Rouge, LA
Birmingham	Section 21	Birmingham, AL
Blackhawk	Section 113	Rockford, IL
Boston	Section 9	Boston, MA
California Central Coast	Section 190	Santa Maria, CA
Carolina	Section 87	Greensboro, NC
Central Arkansas	Section 145	Little Rock, AR
Central Louisiana	Section 509	Alexandria, LA
Central Mass / Rhode Island	Section 30	Worcester, MA
Central Michigan	Section 101	Jackson, MI
Central Pennsylvania	Section 105	Williamsport, PA
Central Texas	Section 144	Waco, TX
Central Valley	Section 176	Fresno, CA
Charlotte	Section 140	Charlotte, NC
Chattanooga	Section 31	Chattanooga, TN
Chicago	Section 002	Chicago, IL
Cincinnati	Section 026	Cincinnati, OH
Cleveland	Section 006	Cleveland, OH
Colorado	Section 039	Denver, CO
Columbia	Section 154	Columbia, SC
Columbus	Section 036	Columbus, OH
Connecticut	Section 057	Hartford, CT
Corpus Christi	Section 153	Corpus Christi, TX
Cumberland Valley	Section 197	Hagerstown, MD
Dayton	Section 033	Dayton, OH
Detroit	Section 011	Detroit, MI
Drake Well	Section 168	Franklin, PA
East Texas	Section 150	Longview, TX
El Paso	Section 198	El Paso, TX
Eastern Iowa	Section 162	Cedar Rapids, IA
Florida West Coast	Section 112	Tampa, FL
Fox Valley	Section 074	Appleton, WI
Greater Huntsville	Section 095	Huntsville, AL
Green & White Mountains	Section 116	Rutland, VT
Hawaii	Section 020	Honolulu, HI
Holston Valley	Section 077	Kingsport, TN
Houston	Section 022	Houston, TX
Idaho / Montana	Section 185	Idaho Falls, ID
Illinois Valley	Section 139	LaSalle, IL
Indiana	Section 027	Indianapolis, IN
Inland Empire	Section 156	Richland, WA
Iowa	Section 066	Des Moines, IA
Johnny Appleseed	Section 191	Van Wert, OH
Johnstown-Altoona	Section 501	Johnstown, OH
J.A.K.	Section 090	Joliet, IL
Kansas	Section 035	Wichita, KS
Kansas City	Section 016	Kansas City, MO
Kern	Section 170	Bakersfield, CA
Lake Charles	Section 142	Lake Charles, LA
Lakeshore	Section 166	Manitowoc, WI
Lehigh Valley	Section 047	Bethlehem, PA
Lexington	Section 181	Lexington, KY
Long Beach / Orange County	Section 028	Long Beach, CA
Long Island	Section 076	Westbury, NY
Los Angeles / Inland Empire	Section 008	Los Angeles, CA
Louisville	Section 048	Louisville, KY
Madison-Beloit	Section 079	Madison, WI
Mahoning Valley	Section 018	Youngstown, OH
Maine	Section 102	Portland, ME
Mid-Ohio Valley	Section 129	Parkersburgh, WV
Mid-Plains	Section 182	North Platte, NE
Milwaukee	Section 014	Milwaukee, WI
Mississippi Valley	Section 194	Quincy, IL
Mobile	Section 091	Mobile, AL
Morgan City	Section 108	Morgan City, LA
Nashville	Section 045	Nashville, TN
Nebraska	Section 081	Omaha, NE
Nevada	Section 135	Las Vegas, NV
New Jersey	Section 012	Union, NJ
New Mexico	Section 075	Albuquerque, NM
New Orleans	Section 042	New Orleans, LA
New York	Section 004	New York, NY
Niagara Frontier	Section 010	Buffalo, NY
North Central Florida	Section 188	Gainesville, FL
North Florida	Section 110	Jacksonville, FL
North Texas	Section 053	Dallas/Ft. Worth, TX
Northeast Mississippi	Section 147	Columbus, MS
Northeast Tennessee	Section 071	Oak Ridge, TN
Northeastern Carolina	Section 137	Greenville, NC
Northern Michigan	Section 158	Traverse City, MI
Northern New York	Section 005	Schenectady, NY
Northern Plains	Section 117	Fargo, ND
Northwest	Section 019	Minneapolis, MN
Northwest Ohio	Section 046	Toledo, OH
Northwestern Pennsylvania	Section 060	Erie, PA
Oklahoma City	Section 023	Oklahoma City, OK
Ozark	Section 136	Springfield, MO
Palm Beach	Section 193	Palm Beach, FL
Pascagoula	Section 056	Pascagoula, MS
Peoria	Section 038	Peoria, IL
Philadelphia	Section 001	Philadelphia, PA
Pittsburgh	Section 003	Pittsburgh, PA
Portland	Section 052	Portland, OR
Puget Sound Olympic	Section 041	Seattle, WA
Racine-Kenosha	Section 132	Racine, WI
Reading	Section 100	Reading, PA
Rio Grande Valley	Section 507	Brownsville, TX
Rochester	Section 032	Rochester, NY
Sabine	Section 093	Beaumont, TX
Sacramento Valley	Section 174	Sacramento, CA
Saginaw Valley	Section 061	Saginaw, MI
St. Louis	Section 017	St. Louis, MO
San Antonio	Section 083	San Antonio, TX
San Diego	Section 092	San Diego, CA
San Fernando Valley	Section 109	San Fernando, CA
San Francisco	Section 007	San Francisco, CA
Sangamon Valley	Section 070	Springfield, IL
Santa Clara Valley	Section 078	San Jose, CA
Sierra Nevada	Section 172	Carson City, NV
Siouxland	Section 133	Sioux Falls, SD
South Carolina	Section 097	Charleston, SC
South Florida	Section 080	Miami, FL
Southeast Nebraska	Section 160	Lincoln, NE
Southern Colorado	Section 146	Colorado Springs, CO
Southwest Virginia	Section 179	Roanoke, VA
Spokane	Section 167	Spokane, WA
Stark Central	Section 085	Canton, OH
Syracuse	Section 049	Syracuse, NY
Tidewater	Section 121	Norfolk, VA
Triangle	Section 151	Raleigh, NC
Tri-River	Section 107	Evansville, IN
Tri-State	Section 103	Charleston, WV
Tulsa	Section 034	Tulsa, OK
Twin Tiers	Section 189	Elmira, NY
Upper Peninsula	Section 114	Escanaba, MI
Utah	Section 059	Salt Lake City, UT
Washington, DC	Section 024	Washington, DC
West Michigan	Section 051	Grand Rapids, MI
West Tennessee	Section 106	Memphis, TN
Western Carolina	Section 195	Asheville, NC
Wheeling	Section 186	Wheeling, WV
Willamette Valley	Section 141	Albany, OR
Wyoming	Section 192	Green River, WY
York-Lancaster	Section 043	York, PA

List of section in other country
Section name	Section number	Country
Alberta	Section 216	Canada
British Columbia	Section 218	Canada
Chile	Section 227	Chile
Chihuahua	Section 233	Mexico
Costa Rica	Section 230	Costa Rica and Panama
Ecuador	Section 226	Ecuador
Emirates	Section 201	Emirates
Germany	Section 209	Germany
India	Section 221	India
Israel	Section 202	Israel
Korea	Section 225	South Korea
Malaysia	Section 231	Malaysia
Monterrey	Section 232	Mexico
Montreal	Section 206	Canada
Peru	Section 212	Peru
Rio de la Plata	Section 202	Argentina
Saskatoon	Section 224	Canada
Saudi Arabia	Section 205	Saudi Arabia
Shanghai	Section 234	China
Singapore	Section 229	Singapore
Skandinavia	Section 208	Denmark
Taiwan	Section 211	Taiwan
Trinidad and Tobago	Section 214	Trinidad and Tobago

== AWS Foundation ==
The American Welding Society Foundation was founded in 1989 to support research and education in welding and related technologies. It is committed to annually awarding fellowships to deserving graduate students for important research in areas important to the requirements of industry. Accordingly, each year the AWS Foundation administers two $25,000 grants – matched in kind by the participating universities. The award of scholarships to vocational and undergraduate college students is also a high priority.

== AWS awards ==
The Image of Welding Awards, presented by the American Welding Society and WEMCO, an association of welding manufacturers, recognize individuals and organizations that have shown exemplary dedication to promoting the image of welding in their communities. Starting in 2015, the awards will now be known as the Excellence in Welding Awards. Recipients of this award will receive a zinc die-cast, 24k gold statue designed by New York firm, Society Awards. Additionally, the American Welding Society awards LECTURE AWARDS including the Comfort A. Adams Lecture Award and Plummer Memorial Education Lecture Award, EDUCATION/MERITORIOUS/SERVICE AWARDS including the Adams Memorial Membership Award, Howard E. Adkins Memorial Instructor Membership Award, Dalton E. Hamilton Memorial CWI of the Year, Samuel Wylie Miller Memorial Medal Award, Private Sector Instructor Membership Award, R. D. Thomas Memorial Award, Elihu Thomson Resistance Welding Award, HONORARY-MERITORIOUS AWARDS including Honorary Member Award, International Meritorious Award, William Irrgang Memorial Award, National Meritorious Award, George E. Willis, WELDING JOURNAL PAPER AWARDS including A. F. Davis Silver Medal Award (4 categories), W. H. Hobart Memorial Medal Award, Charles H. Jennings Memorial Award, James F. Lincoln Gold Medal Award, McKay-Helm Award, Robert L. Peaslee Brazing and Soldering Award, Warren F. Savage Memorial Award, William Spraragen Memorial Award, Damian Kotecki Award, Thomas W. Eagar Award, AWARDS RECOGNIZING OUTSTANDING ACHIEVEMENTS including Kenneth L. Brown Memorial Safety and Health Award, Robert J. Conkling Memorial Award, Excellence in Robotic and Automated Arc Welding Award, AWS Extraordinary Welding Awards, Poster Sessions Awards, Professor Koichi Masubuchi Award, Excellence in Welding Awards, Distinguished Welder Award, AWS COUNSELOR, AWS FELLOW and AWS CWI LIFETIME ACHIEVEMENT AWARD.

== Standing committees ==
The American Welding Society also has several standing committees, or partner organizations, which help promote and advance different facets of the welding industry. These include:

- BSMC – Brazing & Soldering Manufacturers Committee
- ITSA – International Thermal Spray Association
- RWMA – Resistance Welding Manufacturing Alliance
- WEMCO – An association of Welding Manufacturers

== 2026 Officers ==
Position	Name
President	D. Joshua Burgess
Vice president	Kerry Shatell
Vice president	J. Jones
Vice president	Walter J. Sperko
Treasurer	Mary Bihrle

== See also ==
- List of welding codes
- International Institute of Welding
- American Society of Mechanical Engineers
