= Microwave welding =

Microwave welding is a plastic welding process that utilizes alternating electromagnetic fields in the microwave band to join thermoplastic base materials that are melted by the phenomenon of dielectric heating.

== See also ==
- Dielectric heating
- Plastic welding
- Radio-frequency welding
