= Metal stitching =

Cold technique for repairing cast metal

Metal stitching is an industrial technique for repairing cracked and broken cast iron, steel, bronze or aluminium structures and their components. The process is carried out cold, without welding. It allows the repair of cast iron and cast steel, often in-situ, without the distortion from welding, and can be used in other situations where heat cannot be used to achieve a repair.

== Background ==
The metal stitching process was developed in the late 1930s as an option for repairing cast iron components and equipment on the Texas oil fields. The process was developed to provide a permanent, stress-free repair and utilized when the use of heat or open flame was limited or not allowed. Four men have been credited with the development of this new metal locking technique: Lawrence B. Scott, Fred Lewis, Earl Reynolds and Hal W. Harman. However, it was Hal Harman who initially invented the metal stitching technique, and he filed for a patent to the technique in the 7th of August, 1937.

In 1938 L.B. Scott was officially credited with the invention of the Metalock variation of metal stitching, whilst he was still working for Harman. Scott was given patent rights to the repair technique and materials used. Scott used his patents to secure the repair process, called it the ‘Metalock Repair Process’, and began to offer franchises under the Metalock Corporation trade name after starting his own operation in Long Island City, NY. Shortly thereafter, Thomas O. Oliver Ltd. (based in Ontario, Canada) was the first company to purchase a franchise.

Fred Lewis (a partner in the development process) purchased a franchise and began operation in Chicago, IL in 1942. The same year, George Jackman Sr. left T.O. Oliver Ltd. and formed Metal Locking Service, Inc. as a stand-alone company.

Hal Harman took forward his method - called Chainlock. Initially Harman and Scott both offered competing metal stitching repairs. Then, for several years, Harman and Scott proceeded to take each other to court, to contest patent infringements and design rights. Ultimately Harman succeeded and Scott had to concede the process ownership to others.

The first repairs, in the 1930s, were in hazardous oilfields. Just prior to and during WWII, the process was used secretly on US Naval vessels, the process becoming a standard repair method approved by the US Navy after the war. It was in this time period that the process was verified as a credible alternative to welding.

Over the years alternative variations of the metal stitching processes were developed, they use terms like Metal Stitch, and Metal Locking, and Metalock to describe their repair process. Lock-N-Stitch is a slightly different stitching method, that was developed from the original stitching concept, by Gary J Reed.

=== Development of the process ===
Major Edward Peckham, a Canadian engineer originally of the Canadian army, was so impressed by what he saw in Texas that he brought the metalock process to Europe, and in 1947 opened an office in London, England. Peckham registered the Metalock Casting Repair Service, which became Metalock (Britain) Ltd. In 1953, to coordinate the expansion of the new process, the Metalock International Association was started in London. An engineering standard was developed to ensure the best possible outcome for a metalock repair.

During the early years, from the 1953 to the 1970s, research was applied to improve the process in Sweden, Germany and the UK. This resulted in improvement in two main areas; the creation of a material for the key that was designed for maximum strength under operating conditions. And the development of the key design and dimensions, and how to locate the keys in as best layout possible.

During the mid 20th century, the process gained rapid popularity among engineers and in manufacturing. The evidence of this is in the publications of specialist engineering publications

== Process description ==
The metalock process consists of a series of steps, that uses metal alloy ‘locks’ or 'keys' that are inserted into the cast iron across and at right angles to the fracture. The process is applied to a fracture, or to a complete break in the material. There is often related damage caused in the break, that has to be cut out prior to repair.

The steps in the process are:

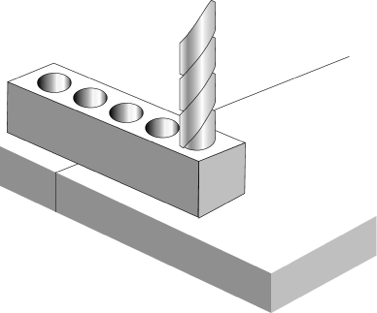
Groups of holes are drilled across the line of fracture to the tool depth of the casting.

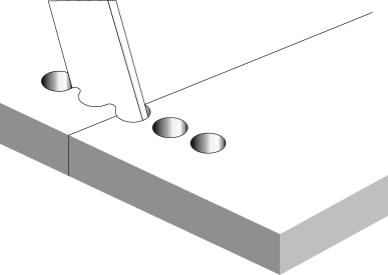
The holes are then joined to conform to the shape of the Metalock Keys

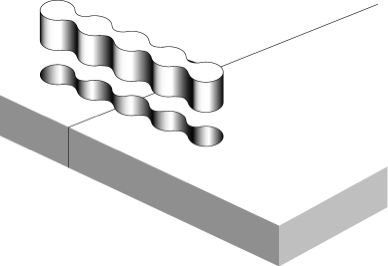
The keys are inserted in the apertures

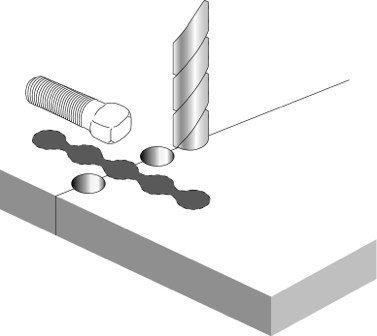
Holes are then drilled along the line of the fracture

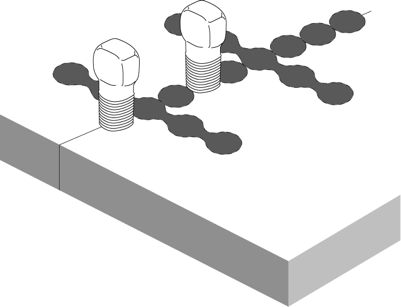
The holes are filled with studs, each stud biting into its predecessor, resulting in a pressure-tight join and restoring rigidity to the casting

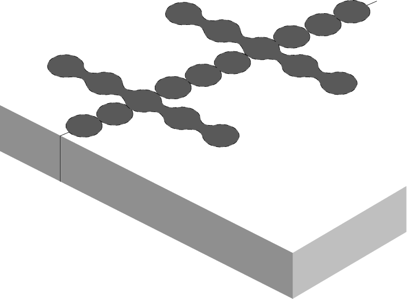
The studs and keys are then ground down flush, completing the repair. When the repaired surface is painted, the repair becomes invisible.

Once complete, the appearance this repair gives is one of a 'stitch' from the sewing of cloth, hence the common term 'metal stitching.’ This method has also been called ‘metal locking’ as it locks in the broken parts of the machine. The durability of the repair is normally high as the technician ensures that the repair maximises the original equipment strength design pattern.

=== Applications ===
As a cold repair process, metal stitching is applicable where heat should not be used, and in situations where the material cannot be successfully repaired by welding.

Situations where application of heat would be problematic are particularly appropriate for cold metal stitching, examples include: oil installations and engine rooms. Often large equipment cannot be easily dismantled and removed for repairs, the metalock repair process can often be performed in-situ with little or no dismantling. It is this feature that created the foundation for the development of the process. More unusual onsite locations expanded to include the repair of ship propellers whilst they are fixed to the ship, large mining equipment that is located underground, and underwater repairs.

Welding introduces thermal stresses into the base metal, and also changes the grain structure of the metal crystals - altering the characteristics and the strength of that part of the equipment. Heat also distorts the alignment of the original surface. Once the equipment is machined and returned to use, the parent metal is always significantly weaker. Often, the site of the original repair then subsequently fails.

The metal stitching repair process however tends to maintain alignment of original surfaces, since the lack of heat during the repair produces no distortion of the completed repair. In addition, the parent metal is not weakened due to material changes. Metal stitching dampens and absorbs compression stresses; providing a good ‘expansion joint’ for castings subject to thermal stresses. It distributes the tensional load away from fatigue points and maintains relieved conditions of inherent internal stresses where the rupture initially occurred. Where the repair involved a pressurized interface, the repair process has the ability to seal the joint.
