= Dry sack =

Dry sack can refer to:

- a dry bag- a waterproof bag used in outdoor activities like kayaking and rafting to prevent damage to water-sensitive gear.
- a variety of dry sherry, also called sack
