= Solvent bonding =

Type of adhesive bonding for plastics

Solvent bonding (also called solvent welding) is not a method of adhesive bonding (the final result does not rely on the adhesion of another substance [adhesive] and its cohesion between two substrates), but rather a method of fusing two thermoplastic plastics. Application of a solvent to a thermoplastic material softens the polymer, and with applied pressure this results in polymer chain interdiffusion at the bonding junction. When the solvent evaporates, this leaves a fully consolidated bond-line. An advantage to solvent bonding versus other polymer joining methods is that bonding generally occurs below the glass transition temperature of the polymer.

Solvent bonding differs from adhesive bonding, because the solvent does not become a permanent addition to the joined substrate. Solvent bonding differs from other plastic welding processes in that heating energy is generated by the chemical reaction between the solvent and thermoplastic, and cooling occurs during evaporation of the solvent.

Solvent bonding can be performed using a liquid or gaseous solvent. Liquid solvents are simpler and generally have lower manufacturing costs but are sensitive to surface imperfections that may cause inconsistent or unpredictable bonding. Some solvents available may not react with the thermoplastic at room temperature but will react at an elevated temperature resulting in a bond. Curing times are highly variable.

== Applying solvent methods ==
Four common application methods are:

- Brush-on method. The solvent is brushed onto the surfaces to be joined, with subsequent pressure being applied until full strength of the bond is formed after the solvent has fully evaporated.
- Capillary action method. Commonly used with acrylic components, a consistent narrow gap between the parts allows the solvent to flow along the surfaces to be joined, via capillary action. Application is generally performed using a hypodermic needle to allow for precise application in the joint gap.
- Dip-dab method. A surface to be joined is dipped into a vat of solvent, with the solvent depth being a controlled variable, for a set amount of time. Once the part has been removed from the vat, a screen mesh or foam pad is used to remove the excess solvent before the bonding surfaces are paired.
- Solvent dispenser method. A dispenser is used to precisely control the amount of solvent applied on each surface.

== Thermoplastic and solvent compatibility ==
The proper solvent choice for bonding is dependent on the solubility of the chosen thermoplastic in the solvent and the processing temperature. The table below provides a selection of solvents commonly used for bonding specific thermoplastics. Mutual solubility between a polymer and a solvent may be determined using the Hildebrand solubility parameter. Polymers will generally be more soluble in solvents with similar solubility parameters to their own in a given state (liquid or solid). The solubility parameters of polymers are not greatly affected by changes in temperature, however the solubility parameters for liquids are affected by temperature. Increasing the temperature lowers the free energy of mixing, promoting dissolution at the interface and interdiffusion bonding.

Recommended Thermoplastic and Solvent Compatibility
Thermoplastic	Compatible Solvents
Acrylonitrile butadiene styrene (ABS)	Methyl ethyl ketone (MEK)
Acrylonitrile butadiene styrene (ABS)	Methyl isobutyl ketone
Acrylonitrile butadiene styrene (ABS)	Methylene chloride
Acrylic	Ethylene dichloride (EDC)
Acrylic	Methylene chloride
Acrylic	Methyl ethyl ketone (MEK)
Acrylic	Vinyl trichloride
Polycarbonate (PC)	Ethylene dichloride (EDC)
Polycarbonate (PC)	Methylene chloride
Polycarbonate (PC)	Methyl ethyl ketone (MEK)
Polystyrene (PS)	Acetone
Polystyrene (PS)	Ethylene dichloride (EDC)
Polystyrene (PS)	Methylene chloride
Polystyrene (PS)	Methyl ethyl ketone (MEK)
Polystyrene (PS)	Toluene
Polystyrene (PS)	Xylene
Polyvinyl chloride (PVC)	Acetone
Polyvinyl chloride (PVC)	Cyclohexane
Polyvinyl chloride (PVC)	Methyl ethyl ketone (MEK)
Polyvinyl chloride (PVC)	Tetrahydrofuran
Polyester	Cyclohexanone
Polybutadiene	Benzene
Polybutadiene	Cyclohexane
Polybutadiene	Hexane
Polybutadiene	Toluene
Polysulfone	Methylene chloride
Polyethylene (PE)	p-xylene at 75°C for LDPE, at 100°C for HDPE
Polylactic acid (PLA)	Ethyl acetate

== Testing solvent-bonded joints ==
There are three main mechanical testing methods for plastic bonding joints: tensile testing, tensile shear test, and peel test. Tensile testing using a butt joint configuration is not very conducive to polymers, particularly thin sheets, due to the challenges of mounting to the load frame. An epoxy may be used for mounting, but can lead to failure in the epoxy/polymer interface instead of in the bonded joint. The most common method for testing solvent bonds is the tensile shear test using a lap joint configuration. Specimens are tested in shear to failure at a given overlap cross section via tensile loading. This testing method is particularly conducive to thin specimens due to distortion mitigation distortion in the test specimens due to the loading mechanism. Guidance for tensile shear testing may be found in ASTM D1002-05.

== Industrial applications ==
There are several industries that utilize solvent bonding for their applications. A few of these include microchip manufacturing, medical, and potable and sanitary plumbing systems.

== See also ==
- Plastic welding
- Ultrasonic welding
