= Plastic joining =

Method of fabrication and damage repair

Plastic joining is the method of joining semi-finished products of plastic materials together or to other materials as a fabrication process or damage repair. Joining methods can be classified into three categories:

1. Mechanical fastening,
2. Adhesive bonding,
3. Welding.

== Mechanical fastening ==
Mechanical fastening methods can offer an advantage of disassembly, but have drawbacks arising from stress concentrations, galvanic corrosion, mismatch of thermal expansion coefficients, etc. which rivets, screws and ropes can introduce (see fasteners).

== Adhesive bonding ==
Adhesive bonding, which involves a chemical process where a substance is used to create a bond between two materials, is problematic because of extensive surface preparation, long curing time, the difficulty of bonding adhesive materials to plastics, etc.

== Welding ==
Welding can eliminate these shortcomings largely, but its applications are restricted to thermoplastics.

== See also ==
- Adhesive bonding
- Mechanical fasteners
- Plastic welding
- Rheological weldability for plastics
- Weldability
- Welding
