= Joint (disambiguation) =

In physiology, a joint is a connection between bones.

In UK English, it is also used for a large piece of meat, usually containing a bone.

Joint may also refer to:

== Construction and engineering ==
- Joint encoding, combining several channels of similar information during encoding to obtain higher quality or smaller file size
- Joint (building), a junction of building elements with no transfer of a static load
- Joint (mechanics), a connection between two bodies which allows movement
- Fastener, used to create joints
- Discontinuity (geotechnical engineering) or joint, a transition plane between two types of materials

== Music ==
- "Joint" (song), a 2007 song by Mami Kawada
- "Joints", a song by Holly Miranda from The Magician's Private Library
- "John" or "Joint", a 2002 song by Upsurt

== Other uses ==
- Joint (cannabis), a cannabis cigarette
- Joint (geology), a fracture in a rock mass
- American Jewish Joint Distribution Committee or the Joint
- Prison or the joint
- Juke joint, an informal establishment featuring music, dancing, gambling, and drinking
- Joint, a TV movie by Yaky Yosha
- "A Spike Lee Joint", a movie production of Spike Lee

== People with the name ==
- Alf Joint (1927–2005), British stuntman
- Maya Joint (born 2006), Australian tennis player

== See also ==
- Bolted joint, the use of screw-thread fasteners to connect parts
- Join (disambiguation)
- Joiner (disambiguation)
- Joinery (disambiguation)
- The Joint (disambiguation)
- "Joint Joint", a song by Dub Narcotic Sound System
- Mortar joint, the filled space between masonry bricks
- Plastic joining
- Universal joint, a bendable coupling between two rods
- Woodworking joint, a method to connect timber or lumber parts
