= Electromagnetic heating =

Electromagnetic heating may mean:

- Electronic heating
- Induction cooking
