= Radio-frequency welding =

Plastic welding using high frequency electrical fields

Radio-frequency welding, also known as dielectric welding and high-frequency welding, is a plastic welding process that utilizes high-frequency electric fields to induce heating and melting of thermoplastic base materials. The electric field is applied by a pair of electrodes after the parts being joined are clamped together. The clamping force is maintained until the joint solidifies. Advantages of this process are fast cycle times (on the order of a few seconds), automation, repeatability, and good weld appearance. Only plastics which have dipoles can be heated using radio waves and therefore not all plastics are able to be welded using this process. Also, this process is not well suited for thick or overly complex joints. The most common use of this process is lap joints or seals on thin plastic sheets or parts.

== Heating mechanism ==
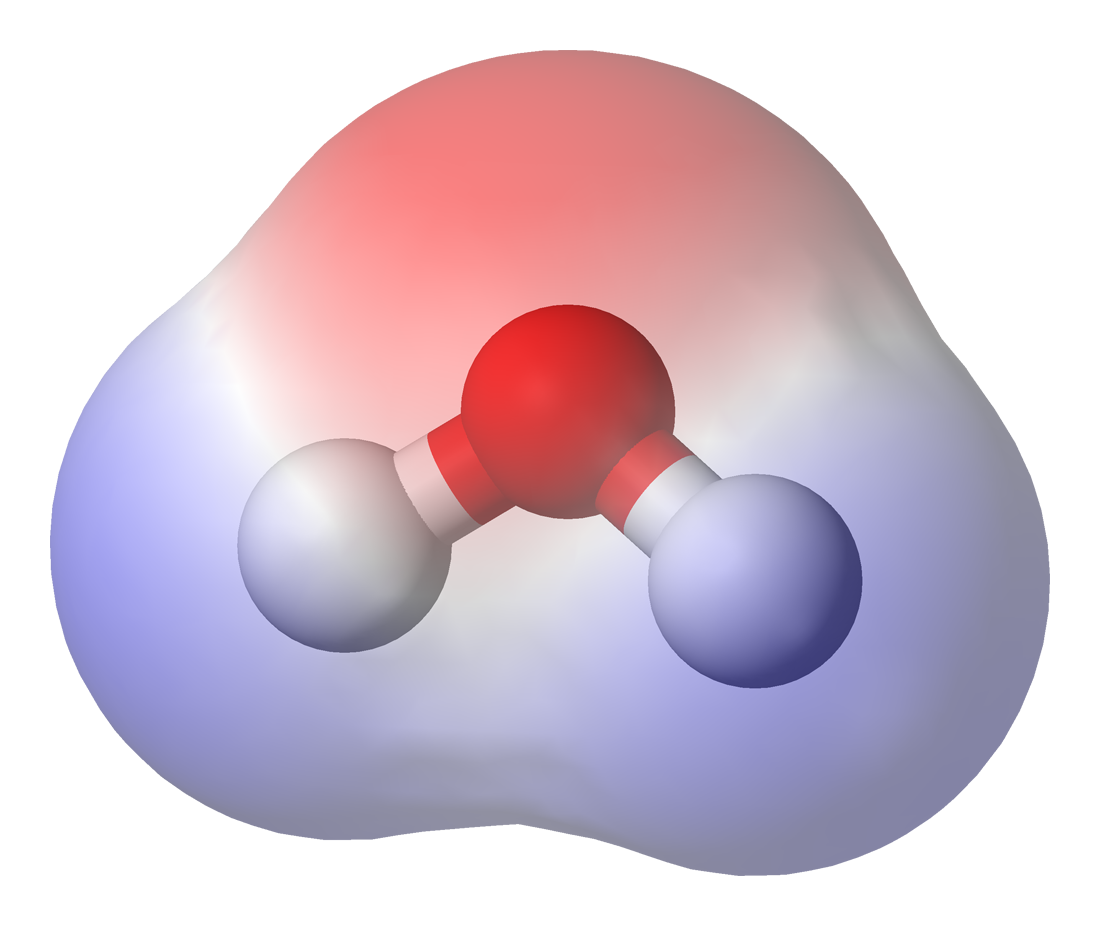
Polarity demonstrated with a water molecule. The region shaded in red around the oxygen atom is partially more negatively charged than the region shaded in blue around the hydrogen atoms.

Four types of polarization can occur in materials subjected to high-frequency alternating electric fields:

- Electronic or electric polarization is the redistribution of electrons
- Ionic polarization is the redistribution of charged particles—cations and anions
- Maxwell–Wagner polarization is a charge buildup at the interfaces of non-homogeneous materials
- Dipole polarization is the realignment of permanent dipoles

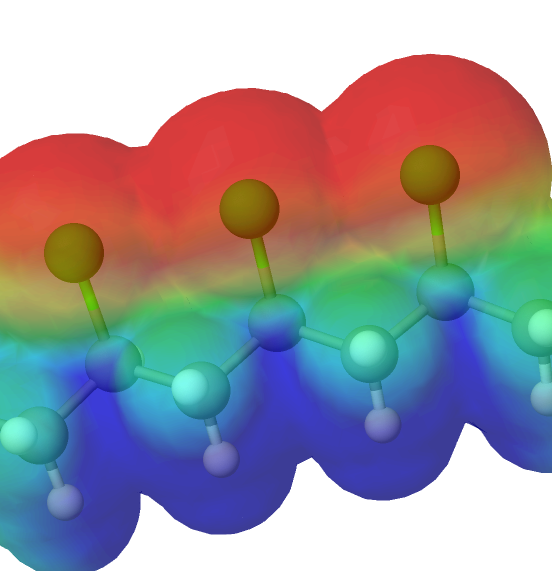
Polarity of polyvinyl chloride (PVC), with accumulation of negative charge concentration in red (surrounding more electronegative chlorine atoms) and reduced negative charge concentration in blue (surrounding less electronegative hydrogen side of molecule).

Dipole polarization is the phenomenon that is responsible for the heating mechanism in Radio Frequency plastic welding, dielectric heating. When an electric field is applied to a molecule with an asymmetric distribution of charge, or dipole, the electric forces cause the molecule to align itself with the electrical field. When an alternating electrical field is applied, the molecule will continuously reverse its alignment, leading to molecular rotation. This process is not instantaneous, therefore if the frequency is high enough, the dipole will be unable to rotate quickly enough to stay aligned with the electric field resulting in random motion as the molecule attempts to follow the electrical field. This motion causes intermolecular friction which leads to heat generation. The amount of heat generated by friction in the material is dependent on field strength, frequency, dipole strength, and free volume in the material. Since the main driving force for dielectric heating is the interaction of the dipole of a molecule with the applied electrical field, RF welding can only be conducted on dipole molecules. The typical frequency range for dielectric heating is 10–100 MHz but normally RF Welding is conducted around 27 MHz. At too low of frequency, the dipoles are able to align themselves with the electrical field and stay in phase with the electrical current minimizing the intermolecular friction that is produced. This can also be described as having minimal power loss from the electrical field since the molecules will stay in phase and absorb minimal energy. As frequencies become high enough, power loss starts to increase as the dipoles are unable to align themselves at the rate of the reversing electrical field. The dipoles become out of phase absorbing energy and this is when heating occurs. At a certain frequency, a power loss maximum is reached to where higher frequencies will have decreased power loss and produce less heating. The maximum dielectric power loss is material dependent.

== Compatible materials ==
Single mer group of PVC, showing asymmetric distribution of atoms of different electronegativities.

Single mer group of polyethylene, showing symmetric distribution of atoms.

The radio frequency heating mechanism relies on a dipole in the molecule in order to generate heat and therefore the plastics used in RF welding are limited to those whose molecules contain an electrical dipole. Permanent molecular dipoles can form due to differences in electronegativities between the atoms of a molecule. Negative charge is shifted toward atoms with higher electronegativity, resulting in more negatively charged regions surrounding more electronegative atoms, and positively charged regions surrounding less electronegative atoms. Because polyethylene consists of symmetric mer groups, no dipole forms, and polyethylene cannot be joined using radio-frequency welding. Like water, polyvinyl chloride (PVC) consists of asymmetrically distributed atoms of differing electronegativities, with a resulting dipole moment. Because of its strong dipolar moment (and other properties) PVC is considered an excellent material for radio-frequency welding. In addition to polarity, properties that contribute to good radio-frequency weldability are high dielectric constant, which reduces resistance to current flow; high dielectric strength, which prevents arcing through the joint members during welding; and high dielectric loss, which is a factor that describes the amount of heat generated by an electric field.

Some plastics commonly welded with dielectric heating include:

- Polyvinyl chloride (PVC)
- Chlorinated polyvinyl chloride (CPVC)
- Polyurethane
- Nylons
- Cellulose acetate
- Ethylene-vinyl acetate (EVA)
- Polyvinylidene chloride (PVDC)
- Polyethylene terephthalate (PET)

Additional members can be added to a joint for a variety of reasons – improving thermal insulation, preventing sticking of parts to the welding equipment, preventing arcing, and buffering non-uniform clamping pressure or electric field. It is possible to weld non-polar plastics by using a conductive-composite implant to improve dielectric loss.

== Procedure and process ==
The RF welding procedure consists of five steps:

1. Loading parts
2. Applying pressure
3. Applying electric field
4. Holding pressure
5. Unloading parts

Loading consists of placing the joint member into the welding machine. The welding operation begins with application of pressure on the members from the electrodes. Generally, the bottom electrode is fixed, and the actuator drives the upper electrode down with a prescribed force. The electric field is applied to the parts for a specified time while pressure from the electrodes is maintained. Dielectric heating causes the parts that are in intimate contact to melt, and the liquid polymers diffuse into each other at the interface. Diffusion and solidification of the joint occur while pressure is maintained for a specified time. Once the joint is cooled and the upper electrode is retracted, the part can be unloaded.

The parameters used to control the welding process consist of:

- Weld time – duration electric field is applied
- Power – electric field power into the joint
- Clamp pressure (or collapse distance) – limit of squeeze pressure (or limit of squeeze distance) parts are pressed together
- Hold time – duration pressure is applied after power source is turned off
- Die temperature – temperature of dies
- Number/sequence of cycles – modification of welding process to perform multiple cycles in sequences to maximize weld quality

The parameters listed are often interdependent, and a process window must be developed to tune the process for acceptable weld quality.

== Welding equipment ==
Radio-frequency welding equipment, generally consists of: RF power generator, control unit, press, enclosure, electrodes, and sometimes a handling mechanism. The RF power generator converts line power to high-frequency, high-voltage power for welding. Typical voltages are 1kVAC – 1.5kVAC at a frequency of 27.12 MHz. The power needed for welding is based on the area of the weld, thickness, and the material. The control unit is the system used for operating the machine. The control unit is responsible for processing the information on the desired welding inputs such as force, power, and heating time, and instructing the other components of the machine to satisfy these process parameters. Some controllers are capable of monitoring outputs and adjusting parameters to ensure satisfactory welding. The press (or actuator) supplies the clamping force pneumatically or hydraulically. The electrodes are a pair of conductive structures that transmit the electric field through the members being joined. The electrodes contact the parts and apply the hold pressure prior to and during welding, and through solidification. Generally, the upper electrode projects from the upper fixture surface, while the lower electrode is a flat conductive surface. In some cases, the bottom electrode can project above the bottom fixture, to conform to geometry or to better localize melting through the reduction of stray electric field. Both electrodes can be fabricated with features to alter the finish of the welded surface. They are usually made of either brass, copper, or bronze. An RF enclosure or a cage that goes around the electrodes and open areas is used to protect the operator from injury including radio frequency radiation. Automated machines can be semi-automatic (requiring the operator to manipulate the parts) or fully automatic (where the machine is responsible for loading, transporting, and manipulating parts).

== Applications ==
The most common application for RF welding is sealing thin sheets of polar thermoplastics such as PVC. Some products that typically use RF welding include beach balls, airbeds, life jackets, book covers, and loose-leaf binders. RF welding is also commonly used for medical items such as blood bags, disposable clothing, blood pressure cuffs, and packaging for certain items. RF welding is most typically used in the construction of products that require a watertight or airtight seal. A welded seam or insertion tube sealing process creates seals that can withstand various types of requirements for certain liquid types or air pressures. An example of this would be for the medical industry, where ensuring the seal is airtight and fluid-tight is crucial.

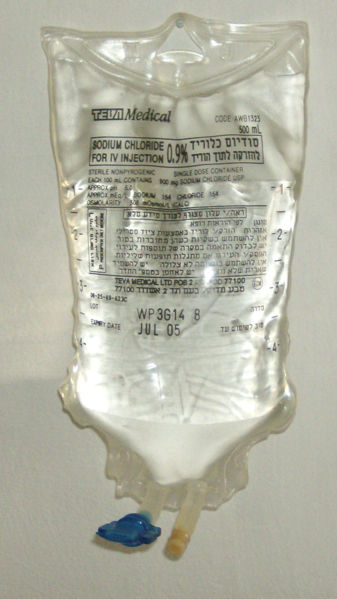
An IV drip bag, showing a RF weld around the perimeter.

== See also ==
- Dielectric heating
- Microwave welding
- Plastic welding
