= Joyn =

Joyn may refer to:

- Joyn (streaming platform), a German streaming company
- Rich Communication Services, a communication protocol

== See also ==
- Join (disambiguation)
