= Hardenability =

Depth to which a metal is hardened after being submitted to a thermal treatment

Jominy test dimensioning

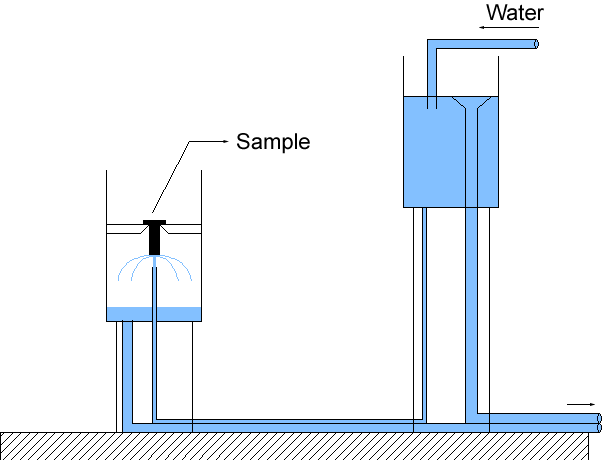
Jominy test apparatus

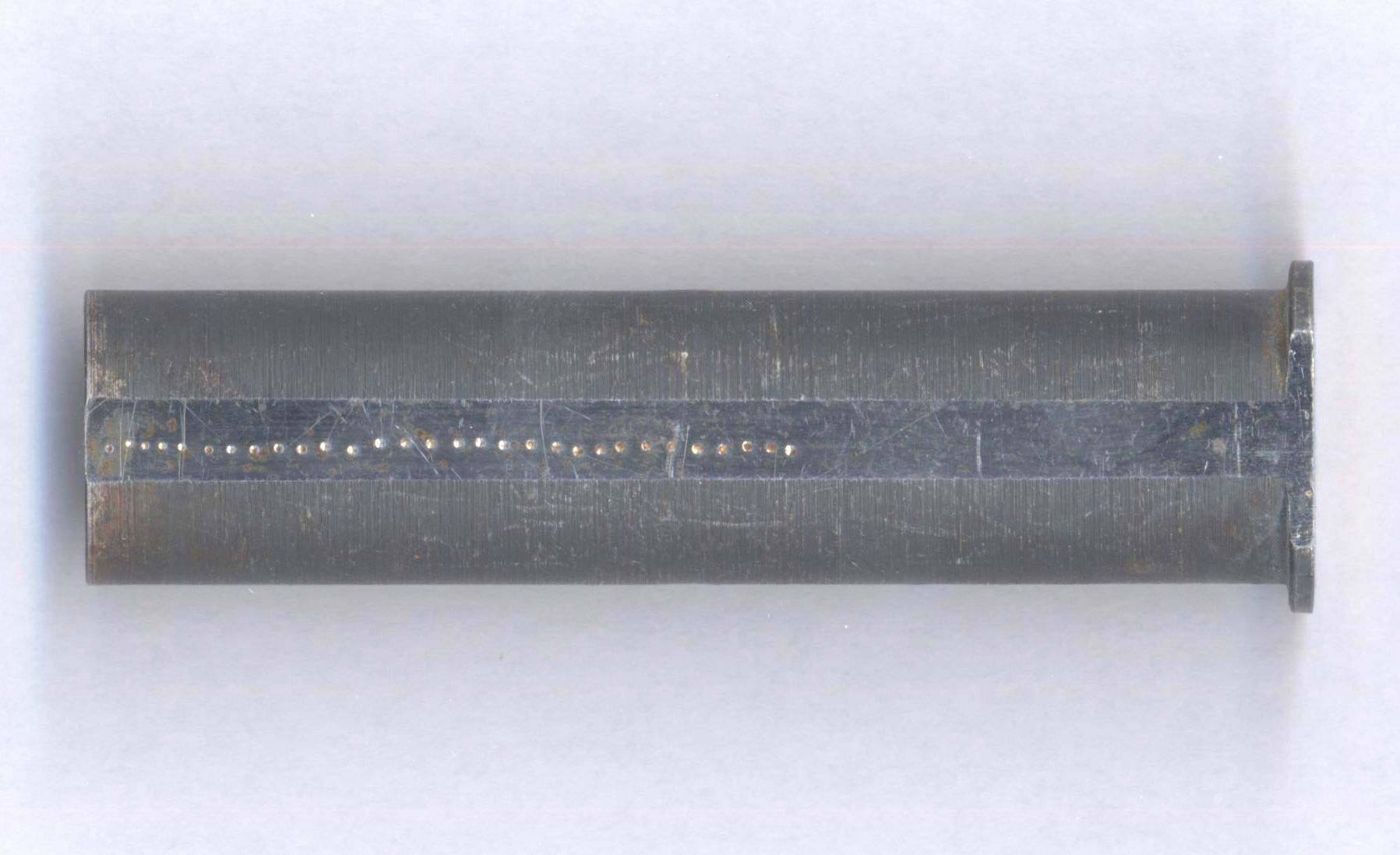
Used Jominy test-piece

Hardenability is the depth to which a steel is hardened after putting it through a heat treatment process. It should not be confused with hardness, which is a measure of a sample's resistance to indentation or scratching. It is an important property for welding, since it is inversely proportional to weldability, that is, the ease of welding a material.

== Process ==
When a hot steel work-piece is quenched, the area in contact with the water immediately cools and its temperature equilibrates with the quenching medium. The inner depths of the material however, do not cool so rapidly, and in work-pieces that are large, the cooling rate may be slow enough to allow the austenite to transform fully into a structure other than martensite or bainite. This results in a work-piece that does not have the same crystal structure throughout its entire depth; with a softer core and harder "shell". The softer core is some combination of ferrite and cementite, such as pearlite.

The hardenability of ferrous alloys, i.e. steels, is a function of the carbon content and other alloying elements and the grain size of the austenite. The relative importance of the various alloying elements is calculated by finding the equivalent carbon content of the material.

The fluid used for quenching the material influences the cooling rate due to varying thermal conductivities and specific heats. Substances like brine and water cool the steel much more quickly than oil or air. If the fluid is agitated cooling occurs even more quickly. The geometry of the part also affects the cooling rate: of two samples of equal volume, the one with higher surface area will cool faster.

== Testing ==
The hardenability of a ferrous alloy is measured by a Jominy test: a round metal bar of standard size (indicated in the top image) is transformed to 100% austenite through heat treatment, and is then quenched on one end with room-temperature water. The cooling rate will be highest at the end being quenched, and will decrease as distance from the end increases. Subsequent to cooling a flat surface is ground on the test piece and the hardenability is then found by measuring the hardness along the bar. The farther away from the quenched end that the hardness extends, the higher the hardenability. This information is plotted on a hardenability graph.

The Jominy end-quench test was invented by Walter E. Jominy (1893-1976) and A.L. Boegehold, metallurgists in the Research Laboratories Division of General Motors Corp., in 1937. For his pioneering work in heat treating, Jominy was recognized by the American Society for Metals (ASM) with its Albert Sauveur Achievement Award in 1944. Jominy served as president of ASM in 1951.
