= Dry bag =

Type of flexible container

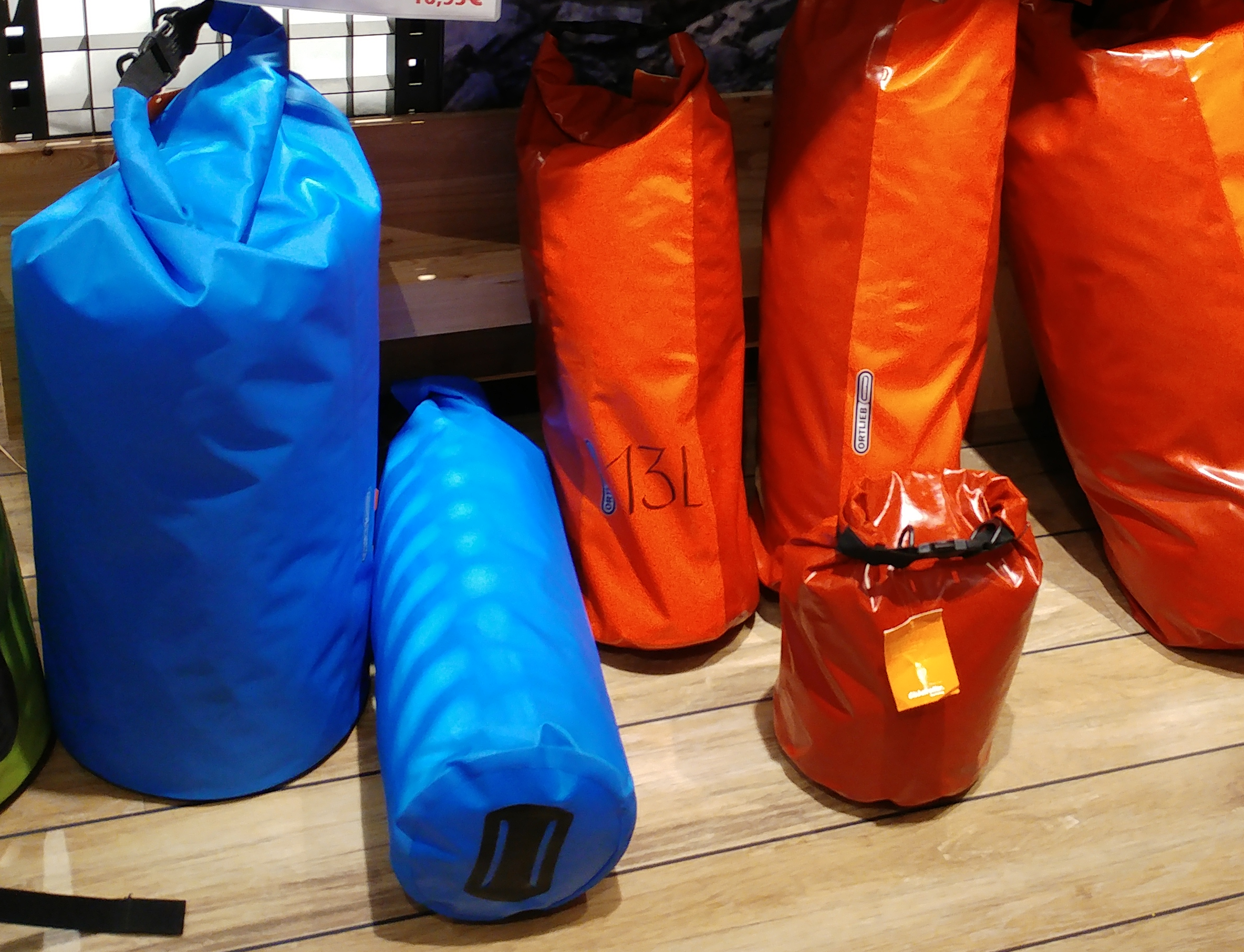
Drybags

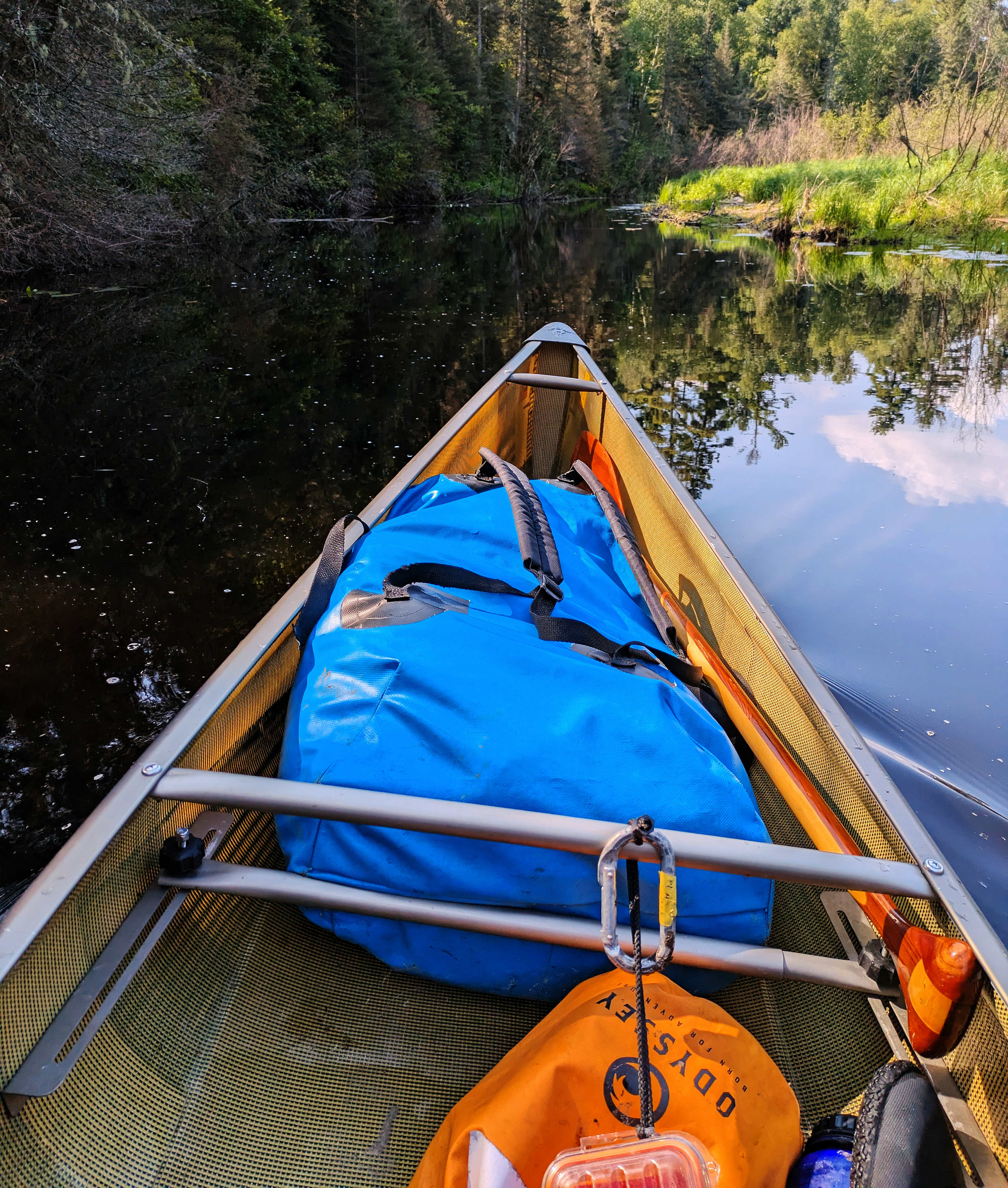
A drybag in a canoe.

A dry bag is a type of flexible container which seals in a watertight manner. Dry bags are often used in kayaking, canoeing, rafting, canyoning, and other outdoor activities in which sensitive items would otherwise get wet, as well as extreme sports such as skiing and snowboarding. Dry bags are used to protect electronics from water. They are also used to prevent sleeping bags and spare clothing from getting wet, as in a camping context.

== Construction ==
They are often a construction of plastic film, plastic-coated fabric, or waterproof fabric ( Nylon, Vinyl, TPU, PVC and Tarpaulin) which is formed to create an impermeable, waterproof bag. Construction techniques include radio-frequency welding, sewing (a seam-tape is used to seal over needle holes) and gluing.

The opening is often a "roll-top", consisting of two firm strips which can be folded over a few times and secured by connecting both ends with a side release buckle to form a loop.

== Sizes ==
A large range of sizes are available, ranging from small bags large enough for a camera or smartphone to mid-size bags large enough for a sleeping bag, to large bags big enough for several sleeping bags and a folded tent.
