= The Joining =

The Joining may refer to:

- The Joining (The Batman character), a fictional character in the animated TV series The Batman
- "The Joining" (The Batman episode), a two-part episode in which the character is introduced
- "The Joining" (The Outer Limits), a television episode

== See also ==
- Join (disambiguation)
