= The Joint =

The Joint may refer to:

- Slang for prison
- American Jewish Joint Distribution Committee, colloquially known as "The Joint"
- The Joint (Sirius XM) XM radio Reggae channel
- The Joint (music venue) at the Hard Rock Hotel in Las Vegas
  - Also the former name of Hard Rock Live Tulsa
- "The Joint" (Blossom), a 1991 television episode
- The Joint, band with Rick Davies and Steve Jolliffe, prior to Supertramp
- The Joint Chiropractic, a chiropractic franchise founded in 1999 with headquarters located in Scottsdale, AZ.

== See also ==
- Joint (disambiguation)
