= Join =

Join may refer to:

- Join (law), to include additional counts or additional defendants on an indictment
- In mathematics:
  - Join (mathematics), a least upper bound of sets orders in lattice theory
  - Join (topology), an operation combining two topological spaces
  - Join (category theory), an operation combining two categories
  - Join (simplicial sets), an operation combining two simplicial sets
  - Join (sigma algebra), a refinement of sigma algebras
  - Join (algebraic geometry), a union of lines between two varieties
- In computing:
  - Join (relational algebra), a binary operation on tuples corresponding to the relation join of SQL
    - Join (SQL), relational join, a binary operation on SQL and relational database tables
    - join (Unix), a Unix command similar to relational join
  - Join-calculus, a process calculus developed at INRIA for the design of distributed programming languages
    - Join-pattern, generalization of Join-calculus
    - Joins (concurrency library), a concurrent computing API from Microsoft Research
- Join Network Studio of NENU, a non-profit organization of Northeast Normal University
- Joins.com, the website for South Korean newspaper JoongAng Ilbo
- Joining (woodworking), woodworking processes of combining two or more pieces of wood together, generally through the use of nails.

== See also ==
- Joiner (disambiguation)
- The Joining (disambiguation)
- Joint (disambiguation)
- Joyn (disambiguation)
