= Rheological weldability =

Rheological weldability (RW) of thermoplastics considers the materials flow characteristics in determining the weldability of the given material. The process of welding thermal plastics requires three general steps, first is surface preparation. The second step is the application of heat and pressure to create intimate contact between the components being joined and initiate inter-molecular diffusion across the joint and the third step is cooling. RW can be used to determine the effectiveness of the second step of the process for given materials.

== Rheology ==
Rheology is the study of material flow as well as how a material deforms under an applied force. Rheological properties are typically applied to non-Newtonian fluids but can also be applied to soft solids such as thermoplastics at elevated temperatures experienced during the welding process. The material properties associated with the rheological behavior include viscosity, elasticity, plasticity, viscoelasticity, and the material's activation energy as a function of temperature.

== Rheological properties ==
To understand the rheological properties of a material it is also important to recognize the stress strain relationship for that material at varying temperatures. This relationship is attained through experimental measurement of the resultant deformation as a function of an applied force.

=== Influences of microstructure and composition ===
A material's rheological behavior is influenced by a combination of the material's microstructure, its composition, the temperature and pressure acting on the material at a given time. The rheological and viscoelastic properties of a polymer melt are sensitive to the material's molecular structure, including molecular weight distribution and effects of branching. As a result, rheology can be used to develop relationships between differing material combinations.

=== Determining microstructure ===
Melt rheology has shown to be an accurate method in determining the polymer's molecular structure. This is beneficial in determining weld compatibility between materials; as materials with drastically different flow characteristics will be more difficult to join compared to those with more closely matched viscosity and melting temperature properties. This information can also be used to help determine weld parameters for the given welding process to be used.

== Viscosity ==
The lower the η, the better the RW

Regarding sessile drop technique, wetting is characterized by degree of interfacial contact and quantified via contact angle (θ_{c}) of a liquid on a solid surface at equilibrium, as shown in Fig. 1. Interrelation between contact angle and surface tensions at equilibrium is given by the Young equation:

$$\gamma_{SG}\ =\gamma_{SL}+\gamma_{LG}\cos{\theta_{c}},$$

Fig 1: An illustration of the sessile drop technique with a liquid droplet partially wetting a solid substrate at equilibrium. $\theta_C$ is the contact angle, and $\gamma_{SG}\$, $\gamma_{LG}\$, $\gamma_{SL}\$ represent surface tensions of the solid–gas, gas–liquid, and liquid–solid interfaces, respectively.

Where:

- $\gamma_{SG}$ = Solid-Gas surface tension,
- $\gamma_{SL}$ = Solid-Liquid surface tension,
- $\gamma_{LG}$ = Liquid-Gas surface tension,
- $\theta_{c}$ = Contact angle.

For perfectly good wetting, contact angle (θ_{c}) at equilibrium should be minimized. However, it is valid only at equilibrium, and rate of the equilibrium depends on the balance between driving force of wetting and viscosity of the liquid. In the case of polymer melts, viscosity can be very high and it may take a long time to reach the equilibrium contact angle (dynamic contact angle is likely higher than the contact angle at equilibrium).

Consequently, for the evaluation of weldability, viscosity of molten thermoplastics (polymer melts) have to be taken into account since welding is a rapid process. It can be said that the lower the viscosity during welding process (at welding temperature and pressure), the better the weldability.

Recalling that viscosity (η) decreases with increasing temperature (T) and shear rate ($\dot\gamma$) for most polymer melts, weldability is better where temperature and shear rate (movement) are higher within the entire cross-section of the welding region.

== Elasticity ==
The lower a material's elasticity, the better the RW

Elasticity is best described by stretching a rubber band. As one pulls on the rubber band it stretches and when the pulling force is lessened and finally removed the rubber band returns to its original length. Similarly, when a force or load is applied to most materials the material deforms and as long as the force has not exceeded the material's yield strength the material will return to its original shape when the force or load is removed. The material property associated with a material's elasticity is called Young's modulus and the relationship between the amount of deformation for a given load is described by Hooke's law.

$$\sigma = E\left(L-Lo\right)/Lo$$

Where $\sigma$, or the stress experienced by the material and equals the change in length divided by the original length multiplied by the material's elasticity or Yong's modulus "E".

== Plasticity ==
The lower a material's plasticity, the better the RW

A material's ability to deform elastically while resisting flow is called plasticity. When an applied force or load exceeds the material's yield strength the material begins to deform plastically and the material will no longer return to its original shape. During the welding processes of polymers, this is experienced at temperatures above the glass transition temperature and below the material's melting temperature.

== Viscoelasticity ==
=== Linear viscoelasticity ===
Linear viscoelastic behavior can be observed when a material experiences small and slow deformation at very slow shear rates, where the relaxation process has sufficient time to keep up with the process. This can also be experienced at the onset of larger deformation forces.

=== Nonlinear viscoelasticity ===
A polymer's response to fast and large deformation forces is a non-linear behavior and is more representative of the reactions experienced during the welding processes.

Knowing the viscoelastic behavior allows for adjustments to temperature and pressure during the weld process in order to improve the weld quality.

== Activation energy ==
The lower the |E_{a}|, the better the RW

During operation of a welding process, the softened or molten portion of thermoplastics (polymer articles) is able to flow through the interface. Less flow results in less diffusion at the interface and lower weld strength. For a polymer melt to flow, macromolecular chain segments must be able to move. When the chain segments obtain sufficient thermal energy to overcome the energy barrier, they begin to move readily. The energy barrier is called activation energy (E_{a}). It can be said that if a polymer’s absolute value of activation energy (|E_{a}|) is lower, its weldability becomes better.

|E_{a}| values of such polymers as PVC decrease with increasing shear rate ($\dot\gamma$), implying better weldability where shear rate (movement) is higher within the entire cross-section of the welding region.

Using viscosity-shear rate ($\eta - \dot\gamma$) data at various temperatures for a polymer, activation energy (E_{a}) can be calculated via Arrhenius equation:

$$\eta = C \exp \left( \frac{-E_a}{RT} \right),$$

Where:

- η is viscosity of molten polymer,
- C is pre-exponential factor,
- R is universal gas constant,
- T is absolute temperature.

The absolute value of the activation energy (|E_{a}|) can be calculated by taking the natural logarithm of the Arrhenius equation. (see Arrhenius equation).

== Weldability of polymers ==
Welding of polymers is dependent on intimate contact resulting in molecular diffusion and chain entanglement across the weld joint. This action requires the polymer to be in a molten state where the melt viscosity and flow behavior have a drastic influence on the amount of diffusion and entanglement. Therefore, the rheological weldability is best between materials with matching or very similar melting temperatures and melt viscosity. Also as a material's viscosity and activation energies are reduced the weldability of that material is improved. For example, welding semi-crystalline to compatible semi-crystalline material and amorphous to compatible amorphous material have exhibited the best results. While a rheological analysis can provide reasonable insight to a material's weldability, in most cases production welding is typically prefaced with a series of tests to verify compatibility between both base materials as well as the process employed.

Similar to welding metals, the solidified polymer weld experiences residual stresses inherent to the joining process. With polymers, these residual stresses are in part due to the squeeze flow rate leading to a specific molecular alignment direction, ultimately influencing the weld strength and overall quality. Having a thorough understanding of the rheological properties of the materials being joined can aid in determining the resultant residual stresses and in turn provide insight to processing methods that could reduce these stresses.

MATERIAL	WELDABILITY
ABS	Good to Excellent
Acetal	Fair to Good
Acrylic	Good
Acrylic Multi-polymer	Good
Acrylic Styrene Acrylonitrile	Good
Amorphous Polyethylene Terephthalate	Poor to Fair
Butadiene Styrene	Good to Excellent
Cellulosics	Good
Polyvinylidene Fluoride (PVDF)	Good
Perfluoro Alkoxy Alkane (PFA)	Poor
Liquid Crystal Polymers	Fair to Good
Nylon	Good
PBT/Polycarbonate Alloy	Good
Polyamide-imide	Fair to Good
Polyarylate	Good
Polyaryl Sulfone	Good
Polybutylene	Poor to Fair
Polybutylene Terephthalate (PBT)	Good
Polycarbonate	Good to Excellent
Polyethylene Terephthalate (PET)	Fair to Good
Polyetheretherketone (PEEK)	Fair
Polyethermide	Good
Polyethersulfone	Good to Excellent
Polyethylene	Good
Polymethylpentene	Good
Polyphenylene Oxide	Good
Polyphenylene Sulfide	Good
Polypropylene	Good to Excellent
Polystyrene	Good to Excellent
Polysulphone	Good
Polyurethane	Poor to Fair
PVC (Rigid)	Good
Styrene Acrylonitrile	Good to excellent

== See also ==
- Activation energy
- Arrhenius equation
- Plastic welding
- Rheology
- Weldability
- Welding
- Wetting
