= Weldability =

The weldability, also known as joinability, of a material refers to its ability to be welded. Many metals and thermoplastics can be welded, but some are easier to weld than others (see Rheological weldability). A material's weldability is used to determine the welding process and to compare the final weld quality to other materials.

Weldability is often hard to define quantitatively, so most standards define it qualitatively. For instance the International Organization for Standardization (ISO) defines weldability in ISO standard 581-1980 as: "Metallic material is considered to be susceptible to welding to an established extent with given processes and for given purposes when welding provides metal integrity by a corresponding technological process for welded parts to meet technical requirements as to their own qualities as well as to their influence on a structure they form." Other welding organizations define it similarly.

== Steels ==
For steel there are three major failure modes by which weldability can be measured: hydrogen-induced cold cracking, lamellar tearing, and spot-weld peeling. The most prominent of these is hydrogen induced cold cracking.

=== Hydrogen-induced cold cracking ===
The weldability of steel, with regard to hydrogen-induced cold cracking, is inversely proportional to the hardenability of the steel, which measures the ease of forming martensite during heat treatment. The hardenability of steel depends on its chemical composition, with greater quantities of carbon and other alloying elements resulting in a higher hardenability and thus a lower weldability. In order to be able to judge alloys made up of many distinct materials, a measure known as the equivalent carbon content is used to compare the relative weldabilities of different alloys by comparing their properties to a plain carbon steel. The effect on weldability of elements like chromium and vanadium, while not as great as carbon, is more significant than that of copper and nickel, for example. As the equivalent carbon content rises, the weldability of the alloy decreases.

High-strength low-alloy steels (HSLA) were developed especially for welding applications during the 1970s, and these generally easy to weld materials have good strength, making them ideal for many welding applications.

Stainless steels, because of their high chromium content, tend to behave differently with respect to weldability than other steels. Austenitic grades of stainless steels tend to be the most weldable, but they are especially susceptible to distortion due to their high coefficient of thermal expansion. Some alloys of this type are prone to cracking and reduced corrosion resistance as well. Hot cracking is possible if the amount of ferrite in the weld is not controlled—to alleviate the problem, an electrode is used that deposits a weld metal containing a small amount of ferrite. Other types of stainless steels, such as ferritic and martensitic stainless steels, are not as easily welded, and must often be preheated and welded with special electrodes.

=== Lamellar tearing ===
Lamellar tearing is a type of failure mode that only occurs in rolled steel products that has been virtually eliminated with cleaner steels.

=== Spot-weld peeling ===
The excessive hardenability that can occur when spot welding HSLA steel can be an issue. The equivalent carbon content can be used as a parameter to evaluate the propensity for failure.

== Aluminium ==
The weldability of aluminium alloys varies significantly, depending on the chemical composition of the alloy used. Aluminium alloys are susceptible to hot cracking, and to combat the problem, welders increase the welding speed to lower the heat input. Preheating reduces the temperature gradient across the weld zone and thus helps reduce hot cracking, but it can reduce the mechanical properties of the base material and should not be used when the base material is restrained. The design of the joint can be changed as well, and a more compatible filler alloy can be selected to decrease the likelihood of hot cracking. Aluminium alloys should also be cleaned prior to welding, with the goal of removing all oxides, oils, and loose particles from the surface to be welded. This is especially important because of an aluminium weld's susceptibility to porosity due to hydrogen and dross due to oxygen.

== Process factors ==
While weldability can be generally defined for various materials, some welding processes work better for a given material than others. Even within a certain process the quality of the weld may vary greatly depending on parameters, such as the electrode material, shielding gases, welding speed, and cooling rate.

Weldability by process
Material	Arc welding	Oxy-acetylene welding	Electron beam welding	Resistance welding	Brazing	Soldering	Adhesive bonding
Cast iron	C	R	N	S	D	N	C
Carbon steel and low-alloy steel	R	R	C	R	R	D	C
Stainless steel	R	C	C	R	R	C	C
Aluminum and magnesium	C	C	C	C	C	S	R
Copper and copper alloys	C	C	C	C	R	R	C
Nickel and nickel alloys	R	C	C	R	R	C	C
Titanium	C	N	C	C	D	S	C
Lead and zinc	C	C	N	D	N	R	R
Thermoplastic^{†}	N	N	N	N	N	N	C
Thermosets	N	N	N	N	N	N	C
Elastomers	N	N	N	N	N	N	R
Ceramics	N	S	C	N	N	N	R
Dissimilar metals	D	D	C	D	D/C	R	R
^{†}Heated tool = R; Hot gas = R; Induction = C Key: C = Commonly performed; R = Recommended; D = Difficult; S = Seldom; N = Not used

== See also ==
- Rheological weldability for thermoplastics

== Bibliography ==
- Degarmo, E. Paul; Black, J T.; Kohser, Ronald A. (2003), Materials and Processes in Manufacturing (9th ed.), Wiley, ISBN 0-471-65653-4.
- Lincoln Electric (1994). The Procedure Handbook of Arc Welding. Cleveland: Lincoln Electric. ISBN 99949-25-82-2.
