= Equivalent carbon content =

Properties of steel and cast iron

The equivalent carbon content concept is used on ferrous materials, typically steel and cast iron, to determine various properties of the alloy when more than just carbon is used as an alloyant, which is typical. The idea is to convert the percentage of alloying elements other than carbon to the equivalent carbon percentage, because the iron-carbon phases are better understood than other iron-alloy phases. Most commonly this concept is used in welding, but it is also used when heat treating and casting cast iron.

== Steel ==
In welding, equivalent carbon content (C.E) is used to understand how the different alloying elements affect hardness of the steel being welded. This is then directly related to hydrogen-induced cold cracking, which is the most common weld defect for steel, thus it is most commonly used to determine weldability. Higher concentrations of carbon and other alloying elements such as manganese, chromium, silicon, molybdenum, vanadium, copper, and nickel tend to increase hardness and decrease weldability. Each of these elements tends to influence the hardness and weldability of the steel to different magnitudes, however, making a method of comparison necessary to judge the difference in hardness between two alloys made of different alloying elements. There are two commonly used formulas for calculating the equivalent carbon content. One is from the American Welding Society (AWS) and recommended for structural steels and the other is the formula based on the International Institute of Welding (IIW).

The AWS states that for an equivalent carbon content above 0.40% there is a potential for cracking in the heat-affected zone (HAZ) on flame cut edges and welds. However, structural engineering standards rarely use CE, but rather limit the maximum percentage of certain alloying elements. This practice started before the CE concept existed, so just continues to be used. This has led to issues because certain high strength steels are now being used that have a CE higher than 0.50% that have brittle failures.

$$CE = \%\text{C} + \frac{\%\text{Mn}+\%\text{Si}}{6} + \frac{\%\text{Cr}+\%\text{Mo}+\%\text{V}}{5} + \frac{\%\text{Cu}+\%\text{Ni}}{15}$$

The other and most popular formula is the Dearden and O'Neill formula, which was adopted by IIW in 1967. This formula has been found suitable for predicting hardenability in a large range of commonly used plain carbon and carbon-manganese steels, but not to microalloyed high-strength low-alloy steels or low-alloy Cr-Mo steels. The formula is defined as follows:

$$CE = \%\text{C} + \frac{\%\text{Mn}}{6} + \frac{\%\text{Cr}+\%\text{Mo}+\%\text{V}}{5} + \frac{\%\text{Cu}+\%\text{Ni}}{15}$$

For this equation the weldability based on a range of CE values can be defined as follows:

Carbon equivalent (CE)	Weldability
Up to 0.35	Excellent
0.36–0.40	Very good
0.41–0.45	Good
0.46–0.50	Fair
Over 0.50	Poor

The Japanese Welding Engineering Society adopted the critical metal parameter (Pcm) for weld cracking, which was based on the work from Ito and Bessyo, is:

$$Pcm = \%\text{C} + \frac{\%\text{Si}}{30} + \frac{\%\text{Mn} + \%\text{Cu} + \%\text{Cr}}{20} + \frac{\%\text{Ni}}{60} + \frac{\%\text{Mo}}{15} + \frac{\%\text{V}}{10} + 5B$$

If some of the values are not available, the following formula is sometimes used:

$$CE = \%\text{C} + \frac{\%\text{Mn}}{6} + \frac{1}{20}$$

The carbon equivalent is a measure of the tendency of the weld to form martensite on cooling and to suffer brittle fracture. When the carbon equivalent is between 0.40 and 0.60 weld preheat may be necessary. When the carbon equivalent is above 0.60, preheat is necessary, postheat may be necessary.

The following carbon equivalent formula is used to determine if a spot weld will fail in high-strength low-alloy steel due to excessive hardenability:

$$CE = \%\text{C} + \frac{\%\text{Mn}}{6} + \frac{\%\text{Cr} + \%\text{Mo} + \%\text{Zr}}{10} + \frac{\%\text{Ti}}{2} + \frac{\%\text{Cb}}{3} + \frac{\%\text{V}}{7} + \frac{UTS}{900} + \frac{h}{20}$$

Where UTS is the ultimate tensile strength in ksi and h is the strip thickness in inches. A CE value of 0.3 or less is considered safe.

A special carbon equivalent was developed by Yurioka, which could determine the critical time in seconds Δt_{8-5} for the formation of martensitic in the Heat Affected Zone (HAZ) in low-carbon alloy steels. The equation is given as:

$$CE* = \%\text{C}* + \frac{\%\text{Mn}}{3.6} + \frac{\%\text{Cu}}{20} + \frac{\%\text{Ni}}{9} + \frac{\%\text{Cr}}{5} + \frac{\%\text{Mo}}{4}$$

where:

$$\%\text{C}* = \begin{cases}
5\%\text{C} &\mbox{ for } \%\text{C} \le 0.30\% \\
\frac{1}{6}\%\text{C} &\mbox{ for } \%\text{C} \ge 0.30\%
\end{cases}$$

Then the critical time length in seconds Δt_{8-5} can be determined as follows:

$$\log_{10} \Delta t_{8-5} = 2.69 CE*$$

== Cast iron ==
For cast iron the equivalent carbon content (CE) concept is used to understand how alloying elements will affect the heat treatment and casting behavior. It is used as a predictor of strength in cast irons because it gives an approximate balance of austenite and graphite in final structure. A number of formulas are available to determine the CE in cast irons, where an increasing number of elements are included:

$CE = \%\text{C} + 0.33 \left( \%\text{Si} \right)$
$CE = \%\text{C} + 0.33 \left( \%\text{Si} + \%\text{P} \right)$
$CE = \%\text{C} + 0.33 \left( \%\text{Si} \right) + 0.33 \left( \%\text{P} \right) - 0.027 \left( \%\text{Mn} \right) + 0.4 \left( \%\text{S} \right)$
$CE = \%\text{C} + 0.28 \left( \%\text{Si} \right) + 0.303 \left( \%\text{P} \right) - 0.007 \left( \%\text{Mn} \right) + 0.033 \left( \%\text{Cr} \right) + 0.092 \left( \%\text{Cu} \right) + 0.011 \left( \%\text{Mo} \right) + 0.054 \left( \%\text{Ni} \right)$

This CE is then used to determine if the alloy is hypoeutectic, eutectic, or hypereutectic; for cast irons the eutectic is 4.3% carbon. When casting cast iron this is useful for determining the final grain structure; for example, a hypereutectic cast iron usually has a coarse grain structure and large kish graphite flakes are formed. Also, there is less shrinkage as the CE increases. When heat treating cast iron, various CE samples are tested to empirically determine the correlation between CE and hardness. The following is an example for induction hardened gray irons:

Composition [%]^{†}		Carbon equivalent^{‡}	Hardness [HRC] (convert from hardness test)		
C	Si	Carbon equivalent^{‡}	HRC	HR 30 N	Microhardness
3.13	1.50	3.63	50	50	61
3.14	1.68	3.70	49	50	57
3.19	1.64	3.74	48	50	61
3.34	1.59	3.87	47	49	58
3.42	1.80	4.02	46	47	61
3.46	2.00	4.13	43	45	59
3.52	2.14	4.23	36	38	61
^{†}Each sample also contained 0.5–0.9 Mn, 0.35–0.55 Ni, 0.08–0.15 Cr, and 0.15–0.30 Mo.^{‡}Using the first CE equation.
