= Dielectric heating =

Heating using radio waves

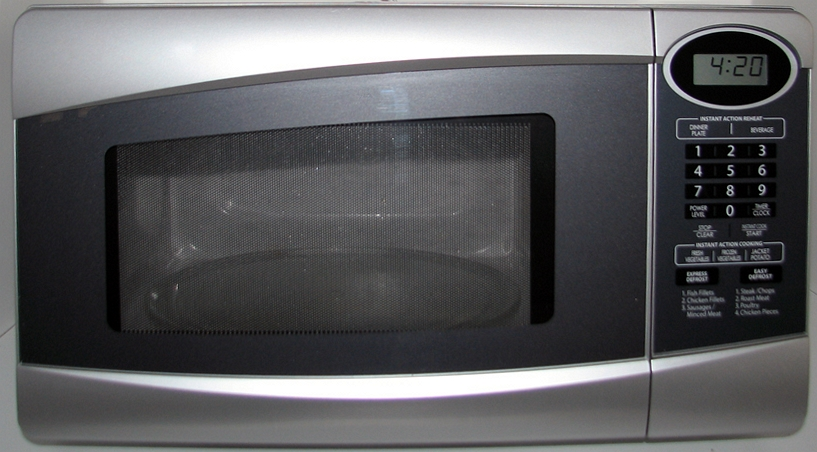
A microwave oven uses dielectric heating to cook food.

Dielectric heating, also known as electronic heating, is the process in which a radio frequency (RF) alternating electric field, or radio wave or microwave electromagnetic radiation heats a dielectric material.

In modern application two classes of dielectric heating are in use. Radio frequency heating or high-frequency heating refers to the use of HF and VHF frequencies (3–300 MHz). Microwave heating works at the higher microwave frequencies (0.3–300 GHz). Both (mainly) work via molecular dipole rotation within the dielectric induced by an oscillating electromagnetic field; the difference is that RF/HF heating involves the antenna near field, while MW largely occurs in the far field, leading to differences in effective range, penetration, and heating uniformity.

== Mechanism ==
=== Dipole rotation ===
Molecular rotation occurs in materials containing polar molecules having an electrical dipole moment, with the consequence that they will align themselves in an electromagnetic field. If the field is oscillating, as in an electromagnetic wave or a rapidly oscillating electric field, these molecules rotate continuously by aligning with it. This is called dipole rotation or dipolar polarisation. As the field alternates, the molecules reverse direction. Rotating molecules push, pull, and collide with other molecules (through electrical forces), distributing the energy to adjacent molecules and atoms in the material. The process of energy transfer from the source to the sample is a form of radiative heating.

Temperature is related to the average kinetic energy (energy of motion) of the atoms or molecules in a material, so agitating the molecules in this way increases the temperature of the material. Thus, dipole rotation is a mechanism by which energy in the form of electromagnetic radiation can raise the temperature of an object. There are also many other mechanisms by which this conversion occurs.

Dipole rotation is the mechanism normally referred to as dielectric heating, and is most widely observable in the microwave oven where it operates most effectively on liquid water, and also, but much less so, on fats and sugars. This is because fats and sugar molecules are far less polar than water molecules, and thus less affected by the forces generated by the alternating electromagnetic fields. Outside of cooking, the effect can be used generally to heat solids, liquids, or gases, provided they contain some electric dipoles.

=== Frequency regimes ===
Dielectric heating involves the heating of electrically insulating materials by dielectric loss. A changing electric field across the material causes energy to be dissipated as the molecules attempt to line up with the continuously changing electric field. This changing electric field may be caused by an electromagnetic wave propagating in free space (as in a microwave oven), or it may be caused by a rapidly alternating electric field inside a capacitor. In the latter case, there is no freely propagating electromagnetic wave, and the changing electric field may be seen as analogous to the electric component of an antenna near field. In this case, although the heating is accomplished by changing the electric field inside the capacitive cavity at radio-frequency (RF) frequencies, no actual radio waves are generated or absorbed. In this sense, the effect is the direct electrical analog of magnetic induction heating, which is also near-field effect (thus not involving radio waves).

As mentioned above, practical dielectric heating runs in two ranges: HF/VHF, most commonly in the range of and microwave.

==== Near-field ====
RF heating generally uses 10–100 MHz. This kind of heating, as a near-field effect, requires a distance from electromagnetic radiator to absorber of less than 𝜆/2π ≈ 𝜆/6 of a wavelength. It is thus a contact process or near-contact process, since it usually sandwiches the material to be heated (usually a non-metal) between metal plates taking the place of the dielectric in what is effectively a very large capacitor. However, actual electrical contact is not necessary for heating a dielectric inside a capacitor, as the electric fields that form inside a capacitor subjected to a voltage do not require electrical contact of the capacitor plates with the (non-conducting) dielectric material between the plates. Because lower frequency electrical fields penetrate non-conductive materials far more deeply than microwaves do, heating pockets of water and organisms deep inside dry materials like wood, it can be used to rapidly heat and prepare many non-electrically conducting food and agricultural items, so long as they fit between the capacitor plates.

==== Far field ====
At higher frequencies, the wavelength of the electromagnetic field becomes shorter than the distance between the metal walls of the heating cavity or than the dimensions of the walls themselves. This is the case inside a microwave oven. In such cases, conventional far-field electromagnetic waves form (the cavity no longer acts as a pure capacitor, but rather as an antenna), and are absorbed to cause heating. The dipole-rotation mechanism of heat deposition remains the same.

=== Ion drag ===
The lower end of HF (3–15 MHz) displays a special heating effect on conductive liquids. This is due to an additional mechanism caused ion-drag causes heating, where charged ions are slowly "dragged" back and forth in the liquid under influence of the electric field, striking liquid molecules in the process and transferring kinetic energy to them, which is eventually translated into molecular vibrations and thus into thermal energy. Higher frequencies vary too quickly for meaningful levels of this effect.

== Power ==
Dielectric heating must be distinguished from Joule heating of conductive media, which is caused by induced electric currents in the media. For dielectric heating, the generated power density per volume is given by:

$$Q = \omega \cdot \varepsilon_\mathrm{r}'' \cdot \varepsilon_0 \cdot E^2,$$

where ω is the angular frequency of the exciting radiation, ε_{r}″ is the imaginary part of the complex relative permittivity of the absorbing material, ε_{0} is the permittivity of free space and E the electric field strength. The imaginary part of the (frequency-dependent) relative permittivity is a measure of the ability of a dielectric material to convert electromagnetic field energy into heat, also called dielectric loss. The real part of the permittivity is the normal effect of capacitance and results in non-dissipative reactive power.

If the conductivity σ of the material is small, or the frequency is high, such that σ ≪ ωε (with ε = ε_{r}″ · ε_{0}), then Joule heating is low, and dielectric heating is the dominant mechanism of loss of energy from the electromagnetic field into the medium.

== Frequency regimes ==
The ISM bands are used for dielectric heating. Commonly used options are 13.56, 27.12 and 40.68 MHz (RF), and 915 MHz, 2,450 MHz, 5.8 GHz and 24.124 GHz (MW).

=== Radio-frequency heating ===
The use of high-frequency electric fields for heating dielectric materials had been proposed in the 1930s. For example, U.S. patent 2,147,689 (application by Bell Telephone Laboratories, dated 1937) states:

"This invention relates to heating systems for dielectric materials and the object of the invention is to heat such materials uniformly and substantially simultaneously throughout their mass. It has been proposed therefore to heat such materials simultaneously throughout their mass by means of the dielectric loss produced in them when they are subjected to a high voltage, high frequency field."

This patent proposed radio frequency (RF) heating at 10 to 20 megahertz (wavelength 15 to 30 meters). Such wavelengths were far longer than the cavity used and thus made use of near-field effects and not electromagnetic waves. (Commercial microwave ovens use wavelengths only 1% as long.)

=== Microwave heating ===
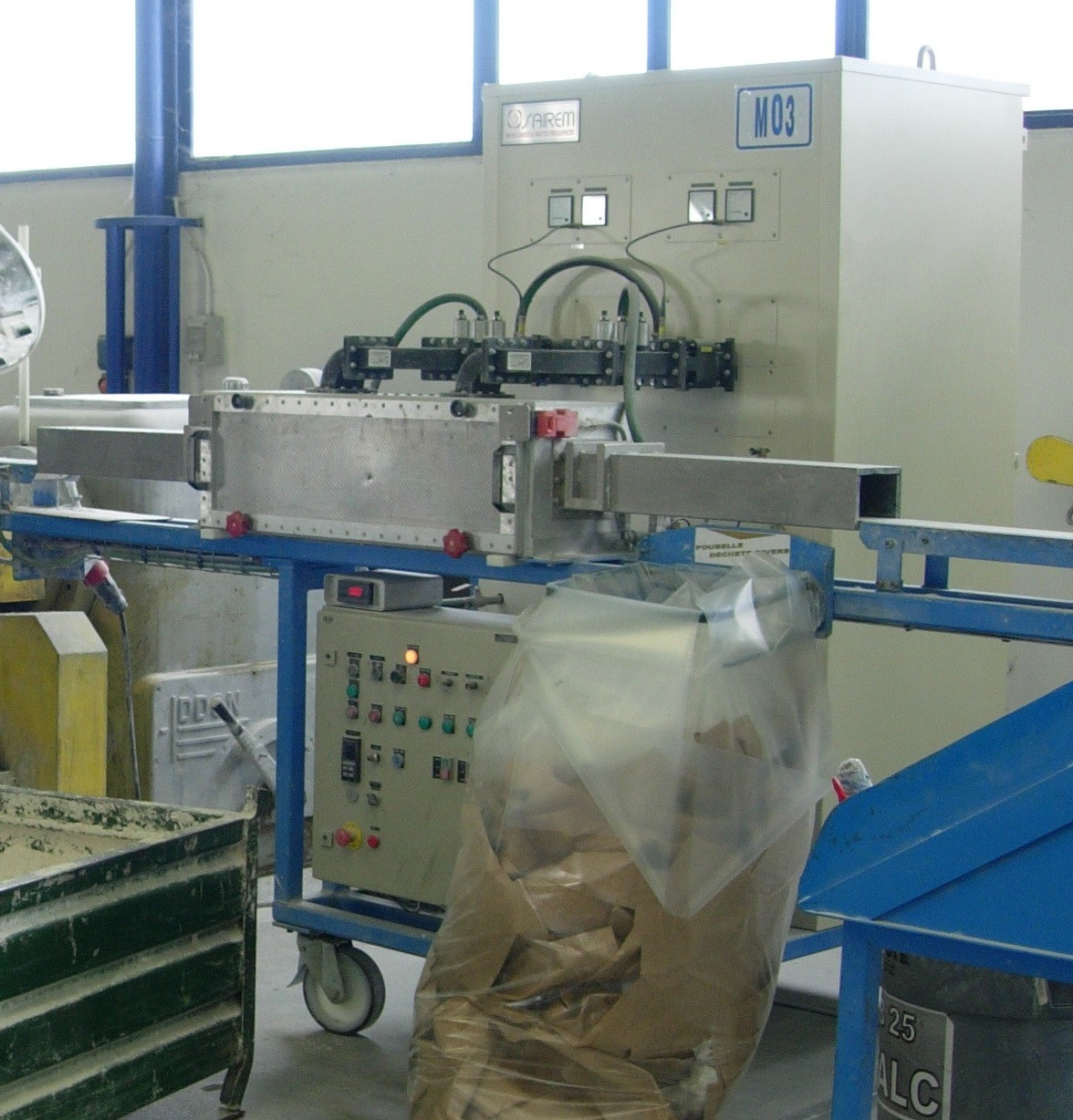
In addition to heating food, microwaves are widely used for heating in many industrial processes. An industrial microwave tunnel oven for heating plastic parts prior to extrusion.

Microwave heating, uses a higher frequency, so that an electromagnetic wave can be launched from a small dimension emitter and guided through space to the target. Modern microwave ovens make use of electromagnetic waves with electric fields of much higher frequency and shorter wavelength than RF heaters.This provides for highly efficient, but less penetrative, dielectric heating. The limited pentration depth can limit the use of microwave processes on large scale. Microwave flow reactors can overcome this limitation for some applications. Typical domestic microwave ovens operate at 2.45 GHz, but 915 MHz ovens also exist.

Although a capacitor-like set of plates can be used at microwave frequencies, they are not necessary, since the microwaves are already present as far field type EM radiation, and their absorption does not require the same proximity to a small antenna as does RF heating. The material to be heated (a non-metal) can, therefore, simply be placed in the path of the waves, and heating takes place in a non-contact process that does not require capacitative conductive plates.

==== Penetration ====
Microwave frequencies penetrate conductive materials, including semi-solid substances like meat and living tissue. The penetration essentially stops where all the penetrating microwave energy has been converted to heat in the tissue. Microwave ovens used to heat food are not set to the frequency for optimal absorption by water. If they were, then the piece of food or liquid in question would absorb all microwave radiation in its outer layer, leading to a cool, unheated centre and a superheated surface. Instead, the frequency selected allows energy to penetrate deeper into the heated food. The frequency of a household microwave oven is 2.45 GHz, while the frequency for optimal absorbency by water is around 10 GHz.

== Applications ==
=== RF applications ===
In agriculture, RF dielectric heating has been widely tested and is increasingly used to kill pests in certain food crops after harvest, such as walnuts still in the shell. Because RF heating can heat foods more uniformly than is the case with microwave heating, RF heating holds promise as a way to process foods quickly.

In medicine, the RF heating of body tissues, called diathermy, is used for muscle therapy Heating to higher temperatures, called hyperthermia therapy, is used to kill cancer and tumor tissue.

RF heating is used in the wood industry to cure glues used in plywood manufacturing, fingerjointing, and furniture construction. RF heating can also be used to speed up the drying of lumber, textile fibers and insulating materials.

=== Microwave applications ===
Microwave heating has also been tested in the field of cultural heritage conservation, specifically for removing harmful black fungi from stone monuments. A 2013 study by Cuzman et al. demonstrated that targeted microwave radiation at 2.45 GHz, applied at 65 °C for three minutes, was able to kill fungal colonies (including Sarcinomyces sp., Pithomyces sp., and Scolecobasidium sp.) found on historical marble artifacts such as replicas of Michelangelo's David statue and samples from the Lascaux Cave. The treatment was effective in destroying the fungi while causing no significant thermal or chemical damage to the stone surface, offering a non-invasive, chemical-free alternative for conservation work.

=== In food ===
In the drying of foods, dielectric heating is usually combined with conventional heating. It may be used to preheat the feed to a hot-air drier. By raising the temperature of the feed quickly and causing moisture to move to the surface, it can decrease the overall drying time. Dielectric heating may be applied partway through the drying cycle when the food enters the falling rate period. This can boost the rate of drying. If dielectric heating is applied near the end of hot-air drying it can also shorten the drying time significantly and hence increase the throughput of the drier. It is more usual to use dielectric heating in the later stages of drying. One of the major applications of RF heating is in the postbaking of biscuits. The objective in baking biscuits is to produce a product of the right size, shape, color, and moisture content. In a conventional oven, reducing the moisture content to the desired level can take up a large part of the total baking time. The application of RF heating can shorten the baking time. The oven is set to produce biscuits of the right size, shape, and color, but the RF heating is used to remove the remaining moisture without excessive heating of the already-dry sections of the biscuit. The capacity of an oven can be increased by more than 50% by the use of RF heating. Postbaking by RF heating has also been applied to breakfast cereals and cereal-based baby foods.

Food quality is maximized and better retained using electromagnetic energy than conventional heating. Conventional heating results in a large disparity in temperature and longer processing times, which can cause overprocessing on the food surface and impairment of the overall quality of the product. Electromagnetic energy can achieve higher processing temperatures in shorter times, therefore, more nutritional and sensory properties are conserved.

== See also ==
- Dielectric welding
- Electrosurgery, which requires direct joule heating of tissue, and thus directly transmitted high frequency currents
- Specific absorption rate
- Induction heating
