= Plastic welding =

Welding of semi-finished plastic materials

Plastic welding is welding for semi-finished plastic materials, and is described in ISO 472 as a process of uniting softened surfaces of materials, generally with the aid of heat (except for solvent welding). Welding of thermoplastics is accomplished in three sequential stages, namely surface preparation, application of heat and pressure, and cooling. Numerous welding methods have been developed for the joining of semi-finished plastic materials. Based on the mechanism of heat generation at the welding interface, welding methods for thermoplastics can be classified as external and internal heating methods, as shown in Fig 1.

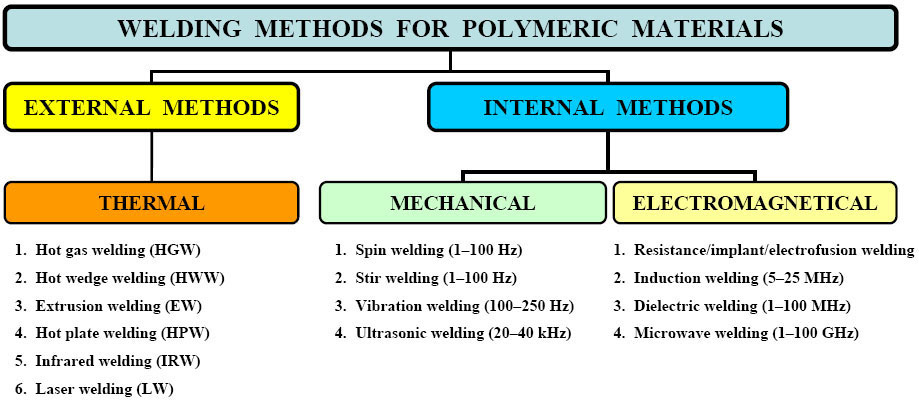
Fig. 1. Classification of welding methods for semi-finished polymeric materials.

Production of a good quality weld does not only depend on the welding methods, but also weldability of base materials. Therefore, the evaluation of weldability is of higher importance than the welding operation (see rheological weldability) for plastics.

== Welding techniques ==
A number of techniques are used for welding of semi-finished plastic products as given below:

=== Hot gas welding ===
Hot gas welding, also known as hot air welding, is a plastic welding technique using heat. A specially designed heat gun, called a hot air welder, produces a jet of hot air that softens both the parts to be joined and a plastic filler rod, all of which must be of the same or a very similar plastic. (Welding PVC to acrylic is an exception to this rule.)

Hot air/gas welding is a common fabrication technique for manufacturing smaller items such as chemical tanks, water tanks, heat exchangers, and plumbing fittings. Hot air/gas welding is also a common repair technique used by auto collision shops to repair damage to plastic parts such as plastic bumper covers and other plastic components.

In the case of webs and films a filler rod may not be used. Two sheets of plastic are heated via a hot gas (or a heating element) and then rolled together. This is a quick welding process and can be performed continuously.

==== Welding rod ====
A plastic welding rod, also known as a thermoplastic welding rod, is a rod with circular or triangular cross-section used to bind two pieces of plastic together. They are available in a wide range of colors to match the base material's color. Spooled plastic welding rod is known as "spline".

An important aspect of plastic welding rod design and manufacture is the porosity of the material. A high porosity will lead to air bubbles (known as voids) in the rods, which decrease the quality of the welding. The highest quality of plastic welding rods are therefore those with zero porosity, which are called voidless.

==== Heat sealing ====
Heat sealing is the process of sealing one thermoplastic to another similar thermoplastic using heat and pressure. The direct contact method of heat sealing utilizes a constantly heated die or sealing bar to apply heat to a specific contact area or path to seal or weld the thermoplastics together. A variety of heat sealers is available to join thermoplastic materials such as plastic films: Hot bar sealer, Impulse sealer, etc.

Heat sealing is used for many applications, including heat seal connectors, thermally activated adhesives, and film or foil sealing. Common applications for the heat sealing process: Heat seal connectors are used to join LCDs to PCBs in many consumer electronics, as well as in medical and telecommunication devices. Heat sealing of products with thermal adhesives is used to hold clear display screens onto consumer electronic products and for other sealed thermo-plastic assemblies or devices where heat staking or ultrasonic welding is not an option due to part design requirements or other assembly considerations.

Heat sealing also is used in the manufacturing of bloodtest film and filter media for the blood, virus and many other test strip devices used in the medical field today. Laminate foils and films often are heat sealed over the top of thermoplastic medical trays, Microtiter (microwell) plates, bottles and containers to seal and/or prevent contamination for medical test devices, sample collection trays and containers used for food products. Medical and the Food Industries manufacturing Bag or flexible containers use heat sealing for either perimeter welding of the plastic material of the bags and/or for sealing ports and tubes into the bags.

==== Freehand welding ====
With freehand welding, the jet of hot air (or inert gas) from the welder is placed on the weld area and the tip of the weld rod at the same time. As the rod softens, it is pushed into the joint and fuses to the parts. This process is slower than most others, but it can be used in almost any situation.

=== Speed tip welding ===
With speed welding, the plastic welder, similar to a soldering iron in appearance and wattage, is fitted with a feed tube for the plastic weld rod. The speed tip heats the rod and the substrate, while at the same time it presses the molten weld rod into position. A bead of softened plastic is laid into the joint, and the parts and weld rod fuse. With some types of plastic such as polypropylene, the melted welding rod must be "mixed" with the semi-melted base material being fabricated or repaired. These welding techniques have been improved over time and have been utilized for over 50 years by professional plastic fabricators and repairers internationally. Speed tip welding method is a much faster welding technique and with practice can be used in tight corners. A version of the speed tip "gun" is essentially a soldering iron with a broad, flat tip that can be used to melt the weld joint and filler material to create a bond.

=== Extrusion welding ===
Extrusion welding allows the application of bigger welds in a single weld pass. It is the preferred technique for joining material over 6 mm thick. Welding rod is drawn into a miniature hand held plastic extruder, plasticized, and forced out of the extruder against the parts being joined, which are softened with a jet of hot air to allow bonding to take place.

=== Contact welding ===
This is the same as spot welding except that heat is supplied with thermal conduction of the pincher tips instead of electrical conduction. Two plastic parts are brought together where heated tips pinch them, melting and joining the parts in the process.

=== Hot plate welding ===
Related to contact welding, this technique is used to weld larger parts, or parts that have a complex weld joint geometry. The two parts to be welded are placed in the tooling attached to the two opposing platens of a press. A hot plate, with a shape that matches the weld joint geometry of the parts to be welded, is moved in position between the two parts. The two opposing platens move the parts into contact with the hot plate until the heat softens the interfaces to the melting point of the plastic. When this condition is achieved the hot plate is removed, and the parts are pressed together and held until the weld joint cools and re-solidifies to create a permanent bond.

Hot-plate welding equipment is typically controlled pneumatically, hydraulically, or electrically with servo motors.

This process is used to weld automotive under hood components, automotive interior trim components, medical filtration devices, consumer appliance components, and other car interior components.

=== Non-contact / IR welding ===
Similar to hot plate welding, non-contact welding uses an infrared heat source to melt the weld interface rather than a hot plate. This method avoids the potential for material sticking to the hot plate, but is more expensive and more difficult to achieve consistent welds, particularly on geometrically complex parts.

=== High frequency welding ===
High Frequency welding, also known as Dielectric Sealing or Radio Frequency (RF) Heat Sealing, is a very mature technology that has been around since the 1940s. High frequency electromagnetic waves in the range of radio frequencies can heat certain polymers up to soften the plastics for joining. Heated plastics under pressure weld together. Heat is generated within the polymer by the rapid reorientation of some chemical dipoles of the polymer, which means that the heating can be localized, and the process can be continuous.

Only certain polymers which contain dipoles can be heated by RF waves, in particular polymers with high loss power. Among these, PVC, polyamides (PA) and acetates are commonly welded with this technology. In practice, two pieces of material are placed on a table press that applies pressure to both surface areas. Dies are used to direct the welding process. When the press comes together, high frequency waves (usually 27.120 MHz) are passed through the small area between the die and the table where the weld takes place. This high frequency (radio frequency) heats the plastic which welds under pressure, taking the shape of the die.

RF welding is fast and relatively easy to perform, produces a limited degradation of the polymer even welding thick layers, does not create fumes, requires a moderate amount of energy and can produce water-, air-, and bacteria-proof welds. Welding parameters are welding power, (heating and cooling) time and pressure, while temperature is generally not controlled directly. Auxiliary materials can also be used to solve some welding problems. This type of welding is used to connect polymer films used in a variety of industries where a strong consistent leak-proof seal is required. In the fabrics industry, RF is most often used to weld PVC and polyurethane (PU) coated fabrics. Other materials commonly welded using this technology are nylon, PET, PEVA, EVA and some ABS plastics. Exercise caution when welding urethane as it has been known to give off toxic cyanide gasses when melting.

=== Induction welding ===
When an electrical insulator, like a plastic, is embedded with a material having high electrical conductivity, like metals or carbon fibers, induction welding can be performed. The welding apparatus contains an induction coil that is energised with a radio-frequency electric current. This generates an electromagnetic field that acts on either an electrically conductive or a ferromagnetic workpiece. In an electrically conductive workpiece, the main heating effect is resistive heating, which is due to induced currents called eddy currents. Induction welding of carbon fiber reinforced thermoplastic materials is a technology commonly used in for instance the aerospace industry.

In a ferromagnetic workpiece, plastics can be induction-welded by formulating them with metallic or ferromagnetic compounds, called susceptors. These susceptors absorb electromagnetic energy from an induction coil, become hot, and lose their heat energy to the surrounding material by thermal conduction.

=== Injection welding ===
Injection welding is similar/identical to extrusion welding, except, using certain tips on the handheld welder, one can insert the tip into plastic defect holes of various sizes and patch them from the inside out. The advantage is that no access is needed to the rear of the defect hole. The alternative is a patch, except that the patch can not be sanded flush with the original surrounding plastic to the same thickness. PE and PP are most suitable for this type of process. The Drader injectiweld is an example of such tool.

=== Ultrasonic welding ===
In ultrasonic welding, high frequency (15 kHz to 40 kHz) low amplitude vibration is used to create heat by way of friction between the materials to be joined. The interface of the two parts is specially designed to concentrate the energy for the maximum weld strength. Ultrasonic can be used on almost all plastic material. It is the fastest heat sealing technology available.

=== Friction welding ===
In friction welding, the two parts to be assembled are rubbed together at a lower frequency (typically 100–300 Hz) and higher amplitude (typically 1 to 2 mm (0.039 to 0.079 in)) than ultrasonic welding. The friction caused by the motion combined with the clamping pressure between the two parts creates the heat which begins to melt the contact areas between the two parts. At this point, the plasticized materials begin to form layers that intertwine with one another, which therefore results in a strong weld. At the completion of the vibration motion, the parts remain held together until the weld joint cools and the melted plastic re-solidifies. The friction movement can be linear or orbital, and the joint design of the two parts has to allow this movement.

=== Spin welding ===
Spin welding is a particular form of frictional welding. With this process, one component with a round weld joint is held stationary, while a mating component is rotated at high speed and pressed against the stationary component. The rotational friction between the two components generates heat. Once the joining surfaces reach a semi-molten state, the spinning component is stopped abruptly. Force on the two components is maintained until the weld joint cools and re-solidifies. This is a common way of producing low- and medium-duty plastic wheels, e.g., for toys, shopping carts, recycling bins, etc. This process is also used to weld various port openings into automotive under hood components.

=== Laser welding ===
This technique requires one part to be transmissive to a laser beam and either the other part absorptive or a coating at the interface to be absorptive to the beam. The two parts are put under pressure while the laser beam moves along the joining line. The beam passes through the first part and is absorbed by the other one or the coating to generate enough heat to soften the interface creating a permanent weld.

Semiconductor diode lasers are typically used in plastic welding. Wavelengths in the range of 808 nm to 980 nm can be used to join various plastic material combinations. Power levels from less than 1W to 100W are needed depending on the materials, thickness and desired process speed.

Diode laser systems have the following advantages in joining of plastic materials:

- Cleaner than adhesive bonding
- No micro-nozzles to get clogged
- No liquid or fumes to affect surface finish
- No consumables
- Higher throughput
- Can access work-piece in challenging geometry
- High level of process control

Requirements for high strength joints include adequate transmission through upper layer, absorption by lower layer, materials compatibility (wetting), good joint design (clamping pressure, joint area), and lower power density.

Some materials that can be joined include polypropylene, polycarbonate, acrylic, nylon, and ABS.

Specific applications include sealing, welding, or joining of: catheter bags, medical containers, automobile remote control keys, heart pacemaker casings, syringe tamper evident joints, headlight or tail-light assemblies, pump housings, and cellular phone parts.

==== Transparent laser plastic welding ====
New fiber laser technology allows for the output of longer laser wavelengths, with the best results typically around 2,000 nm, significantly longer than the average 808 nm to 1064 nm diode laser used for traditional laser plastic welding. Because these longer wavelengths are more readily absorbed by thermoplastics than the infrared radiation of traditional plastic welding, it is possible to weld two clear polymers without any colorants or absorbing additives. Common applications will mostly fall in the medical industry for devices like catheters and microfluidic devices. The heavy use of transparent plastics, especially flexible polymers like TPU, TPE and PVC, in the medical device industry makes transparent laser welding a natural fit. Also, the process requires no laser absorbing additives or colorants making testing and meeting biocompatibility requirements significantly easier.

=== Solvent welding ===
In solvent welding, a solvent is applied which can temporarily dissolve the polymer at room temperature. When this occurs, the polymer chains are free to move in the liquid and can mingle with other similarly dissolved chains in the other component. Given sufficient time, the solvent will permeate through the polymer and out into the environment, so that the chains lose their mobility. This leaves a solid mass of entangled polymer chains which constitutes a solvent weld.

This technique is commonly used for connecting PVC and ABS pipe, as in household plumbing. The "gluing" together of plastic (polycarbonate, polystyrene or ABS) models is also a solvent welding process.

Dichloromethane (methylene chloride) can solvent weld polycarbonate and polymethylmethacrylate. It is a primary ingredient in some solvent cements. ABS plastic is typically welded with acetone based solvents which are often sold as paint thinners or in smaller containers as nail polish remover.

Solvent welding is a common method in plastics fabrication and used by manufacturers of in-store displays, brochure holders, presentation cases and dust covers. Another popular use of solvents in the hobby segment is model building from injection molded kits for scale models of aircraft, ships and cars which predominantly use polystyrene plastic.

== Testing of plastic welds ==
In order to test plastic welds, there are several requirements for both the inspector as well as the test method. Furthermore, there are two different types of testing weld quality. These two types are destructive and non-destructive testing. Destructive testing serves to qualify and quantify the weld joint whereas nondestructive testing serves to identify anomalies, discontinuities, cracks, and/or crevices. As the names of these two tests implies, destructive testing will destroy the part that is being tested while nondestructive testing enables the test piece to be used afterwards. There are several methods available in each of these types. This section outlines some requirements of testing plastic welds as well as the different types of destructive and non-destructive methods that are applicable to plastic welding and go over some of the advantages and disadvantages.

=== Testing requirements ===
Some standards like the American Welding Society (AWS) require the individuals who are conducting the inspection or test to have a certain level of qualification. For example, AWS G1.6 is the Specification for the Qualification of Plastic Welding Inspectors for Hot Gas, Hot Gas Extrusion, and Heated Tool Butt Thermoplastic Welds. This particular standard dictates that in order to inspect the plastic welds, the inspector needs one of 3 different qualification levels. These levels are the Associate Plastics Welding Inspector (APWI), Plastics Welding Inspector (PWI), and Senior Plastics Welding Inspector (SPWI). Each of these levels have different responsibilities. For example, the APWI has to have direct supervision of a PWI or SPWI in order to conduct the inspection or prepare a report. These three different levels of certification also have different capability requirements, education requirements, and examination requirements. Additionally, they must be able to maintain that qualification every 3 years.

=== Destructive testing ===
==== Bend testing ====
The bend test uses a ram to bend the test coupon to a desired degree. This test setup is shown in Figure 2.

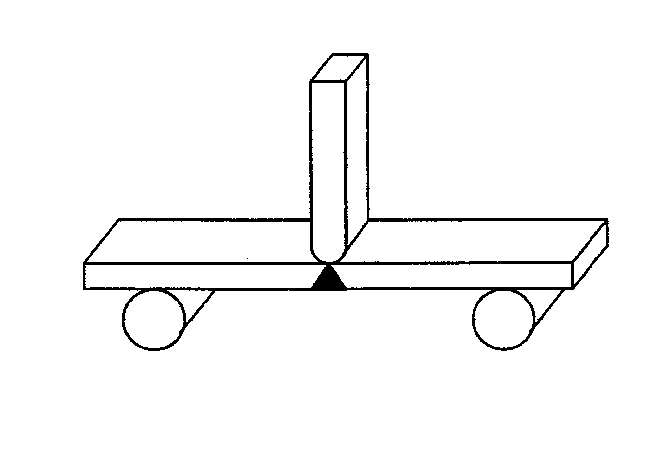
Figure 2: Bend Test Setup

A list of the minimum bend angles and ram displacements for different plastic materials can be found in the DVS Standards, DVS2203-1 and DVS2203-5. Some of the ram speeds, bend angle, and displacement information from DVS2203-1 are shown in Table 1 and Table 2.

Table 1: Ram Speeds of Different Materials
| Material | Test Speed [mm/min] |
| High Density Polyethylene | 50 |
| Polypropylene (PP-R) | 50 |
| Polypropylene (PP-H, PP-B) | 20 |
| Polyvinylidene Fluoride | 20 |
| Polyvinyl Chloride – Unplasticized | 10 |

Table 2: Bend Angle and Displacement
| Thickness of Test Specimen s [mm] | Bend Angle [deg] | Ram Displacement [mm] |
| 3 < s ≤ 5 | 160 | 60 |
| 5 < s ≤ 15 | 160 | 70 |
| 16 < s ≤ 20 | 160 | 85 |
| 21 < s ≤ 25 | 160 | 170 |
| 26 < s ≤ 30 | 160 | 150 |

Some of the main advantages of the bend test are it provides qualitative data for tensile, compressive, and shear strain. These results typically lead to a higher confidence level in the quality of the weld joint and process. In contrast, some of the disadvantages are it requires multiple test pieces. It is typically recommended to use a minimum of 6 different test samples. Another disadvantage is that it does not provide specific values for evaluating the joint design. Moreover, large amounts of effort may need to go into preparing the part for testing. This could cause an increase in cost and schedule depending on the complexity of the part. Lastly, like all destructive tests, the part and/or weld seam is destroyed and cannot be used.

==== Tensile testing ====
When conducting the tensile test, a test piece is pulled until it breaks. This test is quantitative and will provide the ultimate tensile strength, strain, as well as the energy to failure if it has extensometers attached to the sample. Additionally, the results from a tensile test cannot be transferable to that of a creep test. The rate at which the specimen is pulled depends on the material. Additionally, the shape of the specimen is also critical. DVS2203-5 and AWS G1.6 are great sources for providing these details. Examples of the shapes are shown in Figure 3 through Figure 5. Additionally, the testing speed per material is shown in Table 3.

Figure 3: Tensile Test Specimen, Shape 1

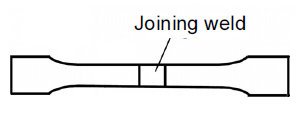
Figure 4: Tensile Test Specimen, Shape 2

Tensile Test Speed for different plastics
| Material | Testing Speed [mm/min] |
| PE | 50 ± 10% |
| PP-R | 50 ± 10% |
| PA 12 | 50 ± 10% |
| PP-H | 20 ± 10% |
| PP-B | 20 ± 10% |
| PVDF | 20 ± 10% |
| PE, electrically conductive | 20 ± 10% |
| E-CTFE | 20 ± 10% |
| PVC-U | 10 ± 20% |
| PVC-C | 10 ± 20% |

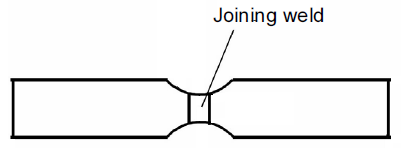
Figure 5: Tensile Test Specimen, Shape 3

One advantage of the tensile test is that it provides quantitative data of the weld for both weld seam and the base material. Additionally, the tensile test is easy to conduct. A major disadvantage of this testing is the amount of preparation required to conduct the test. Another disadvantage is that it does not provide the long-term weld performance. Additionally, since this is also a type of destructive test, the part is destroyed in order to collect this data.

==== Impact testing ====
Also known as the Tensile Impact Test, the Impact Test uses a specimen that is clamped into a pendulum. The test specimen looks like the one shown in Figure 4. The pendulum swings down and strikes the specimen against an anvil breaking the specimen. This test enables the impact energy to be determined for the weld seam and base material. Additionally, the permanent fracture elongation can be calculated by measuring the post-test specimen length. The main advantage of this test is that quantitative data is obtained. Another advantage is that it is easy to set up. The disadvantages are that it too can have a great deal of preparation in order to conduct this test. Also, like the tensile test, there is not a long term weld performance determined, and the part is destroyed.

==== Creep test ====
There are two types of creep tests, the Tensile Creep Test and the Creep Rupture Test. Both creep tests look at the long-term weld performance of the test specimen. These tests are typically conducted in a medium at a constant temperature and constant stress. This test requires a minimum of 6 specimens in order to obtain enough data to conduct a statistical analysis. This test is advantageous in that it provides quantitative data on the long-term weld performance; however, it has its disadvantages as well. There is a lot effort that needs to go into preparing the samples and recording where exactly the specimen came from and the removal method used. This is critical because how the specimen is removed from the host part can greatly influence the test results. Also, there has to be strict control of the test environment. A deviation in the medium's temperature can cause the creep rupture time to vary drastically. In some cases, a temperature change of 1 degree Celsius affected the creep rupture time by 13%. Lastly, this test is again a destructive test, so the host part will be destroyed by conducting this type of test.

=== Non-destructive testing ===
==== Visual examination ====
Visual inspection, just like the name implies, is a visual investigation of the weldment. The inspector is typically looking for visual indications such as discolorations, weld defects, discontinuities, porosity, notches, scratches, etc. Typically visual inspection is broken down into different categories or groups for the qualifying inspection criteria. These groupings may vary among standards and each group has a certain level of imperfections that they consider acceptable. There are 5 tables and a chart found in DVS Standard DVS2202-1 that show different types of defects found by visual examination and their permissible acceptance criteria.

Visual inspection is very advantageous in the fact that it is quick, easy, inexpensive, and requires very simple tools and gauges in order to conduct. Because it is so quick, it is typically required to have a weld pass visual inspection prior to being able to have any additional nondestructive test conducted to the specimen. In contrast, the inspection needs to be completed by someone who has a lot of experience and skill. Additionally, this type of test will not give any data into the quality of the weld seam. Because of the low cost, if a part is suspected to have issues, follow on testing can be conducted without much initial investment.

==== X-ray testing ====
X-ray testing of plastics is similar to that of metal weldments, but uses much lower radiation intensity due to the plastics having a lower density than metals. The x-ray testing is used to find imperfections that are below the surface. These imperfections include porosity, solid inclusions, voids, crazes, etc. The x-ray transmits radiation through the tested object onto a film or camera. This film or camera will produce an image. The varying densities of the object will show up as different shades in the image thus showing where the defects are located. One of the advantages of X-ray is that it provides a way to quickly show the flaws both on the surface and inside the weld joint. Additionally, the X-ray can be used on a wide range of materials. They can be used to create a record for the future. One of the disadvantages of X-ray is that it is costly and labor-intensive. Another is that it cannot be used in the evaluation of the weld seam quality or optimize the process parameters. Additionally, if the discontinuity is not aligned properly with the radiation beam, it can be difficult to detect. A fourth disadvantage is that access to both sides of the component being measured is required. Lastly, it presents a health risk due to the radiation that is transmitted during the X-ray process.

==== Ultrasonic testing ====
Ultrasonic testing utilizes high frequency sound waves passing through the weld. The waves are reflected or refracted if they hit an indication. The reflected or refracted wave will have a different amount of time it requires to travel from the transmitter to the receiver than it will if an indication was not present. This change in time is how the flaws are detected. The first advantage that ultrasonic testing provides is that it allows for a relatively quick detection of the flaws inside of the weld joint. This test method also can detect flaws deep inside the part. Additionally, it can be conducted with access from only one side of the part. In contrast, there are several disadvantages of using ultrasonic testing. The first is that it cannot be used to optimize the process parameters or evaluate the seam quality of the weld. Secondly, it is costly and labor-intensive. It also requires experienced technicians to conduct the test. Lastly, there are material limitations with plastics due to transmission limitations of the ultrasonic waves through some of the plastics. The image in Figure 6 shows an example of ultrasonic testing.

Figure 6: Ultrasonic Inspection Flaw Finding.

==== High voltage leak testing ====
High voltage testing is also known as spark testing. This type of testing utilizes electrically conductive medium to coat the weld. After the weld is coated, the weld is exposed to a high voltage probe. This test shows an indication of a leak in the weld when an arc is observed through the weld. This type of testing is advantageous in the fact that it allows for quick detection of the flaws inside the weld joint and that you only have to have access to one side of the weld. One disadvantage with this type of testing is that there is not a way to evaluate the weld seam quality. Additionally, the weld has to be coated with conductive material.

==== Leak-tightness testing ====
Leak-Tightness Testing or Leak Testing utilizes either liquid or gas to pressurize a part. This type of testing is typically conducted on tubes, containers, and vessels. Another way to leak-test one of these structures is to apply a vacuum to it. One of the advantages is that it is a quick simple way for the weld flaw to be detected. Additionally, it can be used on multiple materials and part shapes. On the other hand, it has a few disadvantages. Firstly, there is not a way to evaluate the weld seam quality. Secondly, it has an explosion hazard associated with it if over pressurization occurs during testing. Last, it is limited to tubular structures.,

== See also ==
- Butanone
- Electrofusion
- Heat sealer
- Rheological weldability for semi-finished polymer parts
- Thermoplastic staking
