= Clinching =

Method of mechanically joining sheet metal

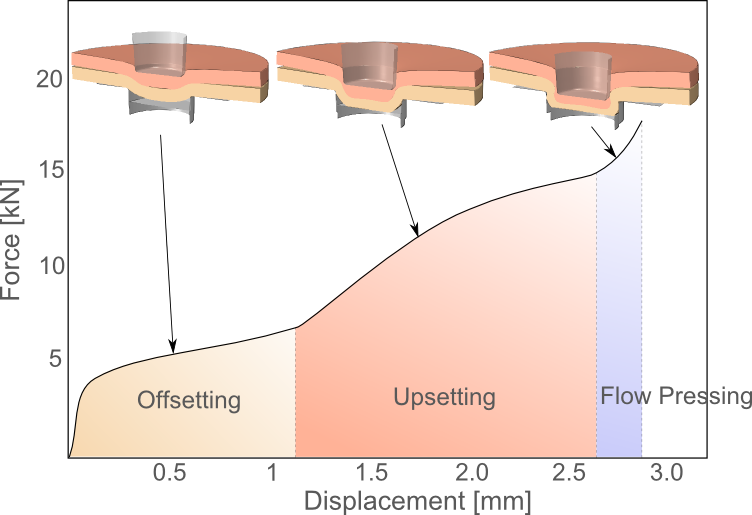
Clinching phases

In metalworking, clinching, sealed clinch joint or press-joining is a bulk sheet metal forming process aimed at joining thin metal sheets without additional components, using special tools to plastically form an interlock between two or more sheets. The process is generally performed at room temperature, but in some special cases the sheets can be pre-heated to improve the material ductility and thereby avoid the formation of cracks during the process. Clinching is characterized by a series of advantages over competitive technologies:

- Reduced joining time (the joining time is less than a second)
- Reduced cost and weight: the process does not involve additional elements such as screws, rivets or adhesives
- Reduced cost of the machine
- No pre-holes are required
- Can be adopted to join different materials including metals, polymers, wood, and composite materials
- Can be easily automated and does not require qualified workers
- Eco-friendly: it does not require pretreatments with solvents, acids, and other harmful liquids
- The mechanical strength of the metal material near the joint is generally increased due to work-hardening
- Cleanness: the process does not produce flashes or fumes
- Repeatability
- Flexibility: the same tools can be employed for a wide series of materials
- Reduced joining forces

== Tools ==
Because the process involves relatively low forces (ranging from 5 to 50 kN depending on the material to join, type of tools and sheet thicknesses), clinching generally involves reduced size (often portable) machines. The tools typically consist of a punch and a die. Different tools have been developed so far, which can be classified in round and rectangular tools. Round clinching tools include: fixed grooved dies, split dies (with 2–4 movable sectors) and flat dies. Such tools produce round joints which show almost identical mechanical behaviors in all plane directions. When round tools are adopted, the integrity of the sheet in the joint must be guaranteed in order to preserve a good mechanical behavior of the joints.

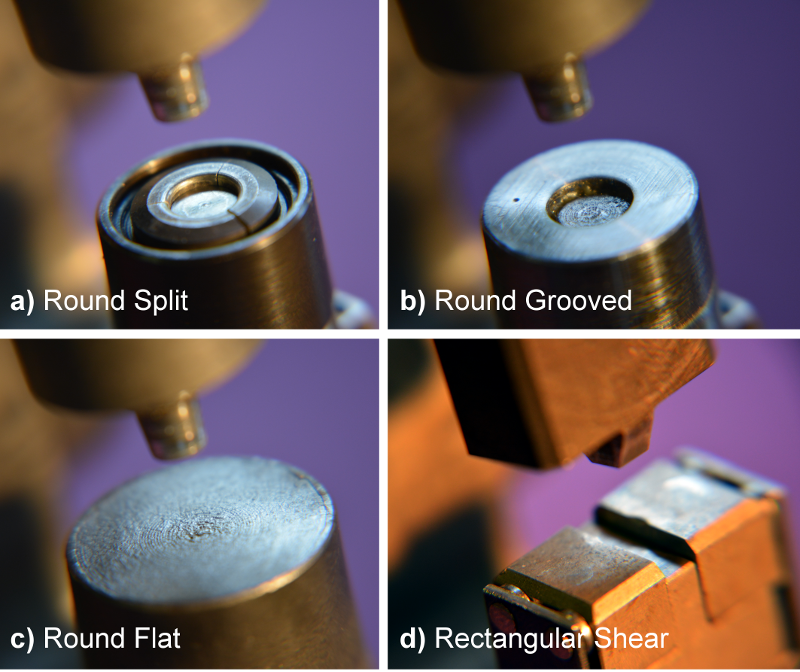
Clinching dies

On the other hand, rectangular clinched joints exhibit behaviors which depend on the loading direction and both sheets are intentionally sheared along the "long direction" in order to produce the interlock. The choice of the tools is highly influenced by:

- Material ductility
- Loading direction
- Thickness of the sheets

In addition, the choice of the clinching tools highly affects the joining strength and the absorbed energy of a clinched connection other than the joining force. Rectangular tools, for example, require lower joining forces than round tools since the material shearing, while among the round clinching tools split dies require the minimum joining force and the largest interlock.

One benefit of clinching is the capability to join prepainted sheet metal commonly used in the appliance industry without damaging the painted surface. Clinching is an important means of fastening aluminum panels, such as hoods and decklids, in the automotive industry, due to the difficulty of spot welding of aluminum.

== Main advantages as compared to welding ==
Clinching is an industry solution frequently used for joining sheet metal in the automotive, appliance / white goods, HVAC / filters, construction, electrical & electronics, office furniture, garage doors, semi-trailers & RVs and other general industries the world over, where it often replaces spot welding. Clinching does not require electricity or cooling of the electrodes commonly associated with spot welding. Being a mechanical joining process, clinching can be used to join materials showing no electrical conductivity such as polymers or plastic-metal composites. In addition, it does not require a substrate preparation such as pre-cleaning of surfaces which is required for welding processes. This fact contributes to reduce the joining costs and the environmental impact (since chemical cleaning is not required). Clinching does not generate sparks or fumes. The strength of a clinched joint can be tested non-destructively using a simple measuring instrument to measure the remaining thickness at the bottom of the joint, of the diameter of the produced button depending on the type of tools employed. Life expectancy for clinching tools is in the hundreds of thousands of cycles, making it an economical process. Clinched connections performed on aluminum sheets have higher fatigue life as compared to spot welding.

== Main advantages as compared to adhesive joining ==
Clinching does not require a pre-cleaning of the surfaces, which is needed before applying adhesives. Clinching is almost an instant joining process (the required joining time is lower than a second) while adhesive joining often requires a much longer time mainly owing to the curing of the joint (up to many hours). Clinched joints are less affected by environmental agents and effect of aging.

== Main limitations ==
Because it is based on the plastic deformation of the sheets, clinching is limited by the sheet material formability (ductility). Metal ductility increases with temperature, so heat assisted clinching processes have been developed, extending the clinching "joinability". Increasing the joining temperature reduces the material's yield stress, so that less joining force is required. Different heating systems are used to heat the sheets before clinching:

- Convective heating is the cheapest solution. It is suitable for a wide range of materials, including metals and polymers (thermoplastics). It is used to join aluminum sheets and polymer sheets.
- Inductive heating offers a fast heating solution that concentrates the heat flux in a reduced area. This method can be applied to metallic materials, such as magnesium alloys.
- Flame heating.

Prolonged heating can increase the grain size or cause metallurgical changes in alloys, which can alter the mechanical behavior of the material at the joint site.

Clinching: Riveting without rivets

== Materials ==
Clinching has been widely employed for joining ductile metals, including the following:

- Low-carbon steel
- Aluminium
- Copper alloys

It has recently extended to other metals, such as:

- Magnesium and its alloys
- Aluminium with reduced ductility (AA6082-T6)
- High-strength low-alloy steel
- Ttitanium alloys

It has also extended to non-metallic materials, such as:

- Polymers
- Fibre-reinforced plastic composites
- Wood-metal composites
- Cardboard
