= Welded wire mesh =

Construction material

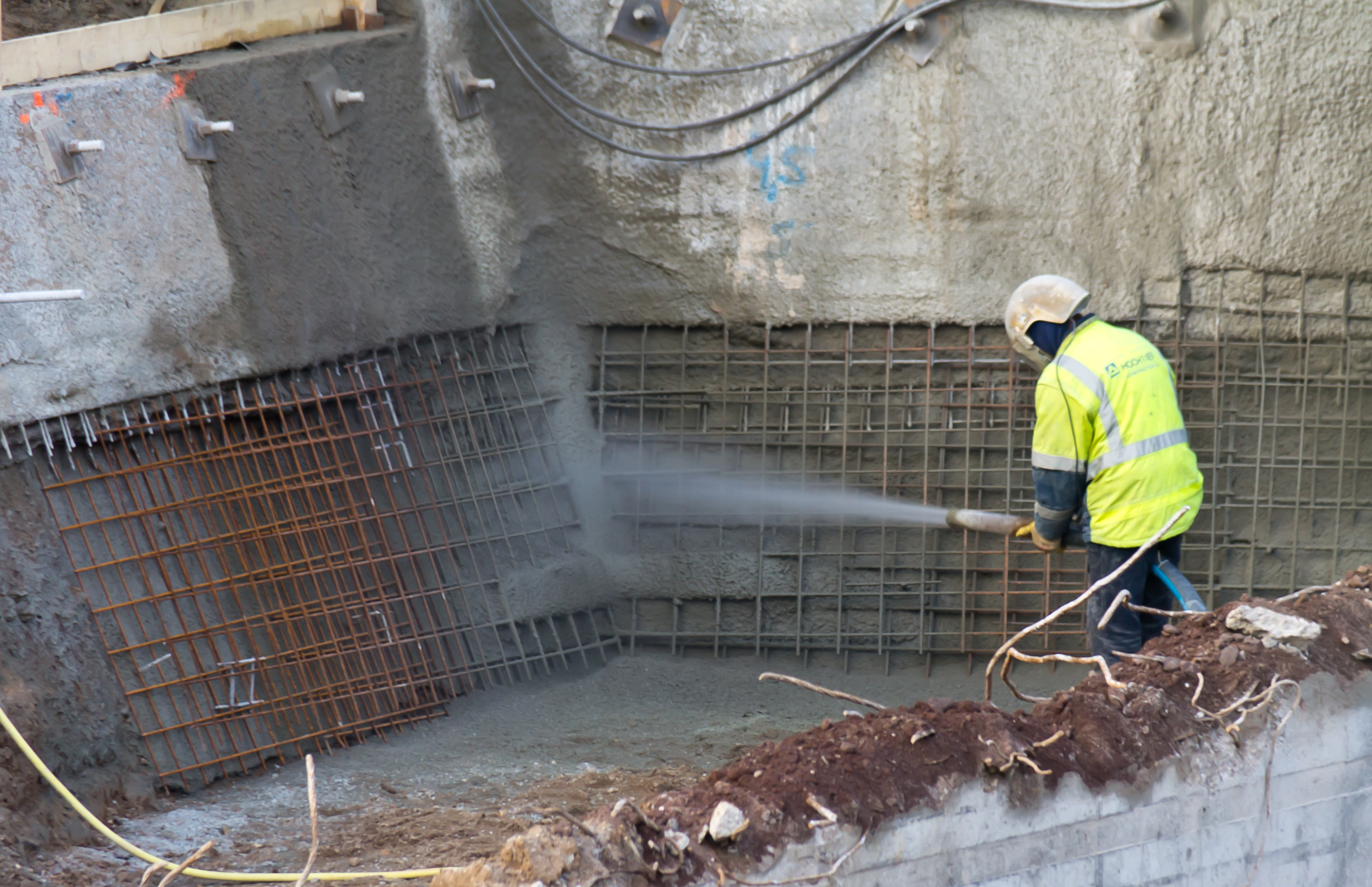
A building worker is spraying shotcrete on welded wire mesh

Welded wire mesh, or welded wire fabric, or "welded mesh" is an electric fusion welded prefabricated joined grid consisting of a series of parallel longitudinal wires with accurate spacing welded to cross wires at the required spacing.

Machines are used to produce the mesh with precise dimensional control. The product can result in considerable savings in time, labour and money.

== Uses of welded wire mesh ==
The welded wire mesh is a metal wire screen that is made up of low carbon steel wire or stainless steel wire. It is available in various sizes and shapes. It is widely used in agricultural, industrial, transportation, horticultural and food procuring sectors. It is also used in mines, gardening, machine protection and other decorations.

Weld mesh is the term given to the kind of barrier fencing that is manufactured in square, rectangular or rhombus mesh from steel wire, welded at each intersection.

Welded wire fabric (WWF) is also sometimes used in reinforced concrete, notably for slabs.

== Types of welded wire mesh ==
There are several types of welded wire mesh which can be categorized according to their structure, use, and characteristics.

=== Welded wire fabric (WWF) for concrete slab reinforcement ===
This type of mesh is a square grid of uniformly placed wires, welded at all intersections, and meeting the requirements of ASTM A185 and A497 or other standards. The sizes are specified by combining the spacing, in inches or mm, and the wire cross section area in hundredths of square inches or mm2. The common sizes are in the following table:

Imperial Size	Metric Equivalent	Weight Imperial	Weight Metric
6x6 W1.4/W1.4	152x152 MW9.1/MW9.1	20 lb/100 sf	0.98 kg/m2
6x6 W2.1/W2.1	152x152 MW13.1/MW13.1	30 lb/100 sf	1.47 kg/m2
6x6 W2.9/W2.9	152x152 MW18.7/MW18.7	41 lb/100 sf	1.99 kg/m2
6x6 W4.0/W4.0	152x152 MW25.8/MW25.8	56 lb/100 sf	2.73 kg/m2
6x6 W5.4/W5.4	152x152 MW34.9/MW34.9	76 lb/100 sf	3.72 kg/m2
4x4 W1.4/W1.4	102x102 MW9.1/MW9.1	30 lb/100 sf	1.46 kg/m2
4x4 W2.1/W2.1	102x102 MW13.3/MW13.3	43 lb/100 sf	2.40 kg/m2
4x4 W2.9/W2.9	102x102 MW18.7/MW18.7	61 lb/100 sf	2.96 kg/m2
4x4 W4.0/W4.0	102x102 MW25.8/MW25.8	83 lb/100 sf	4.06 kg/m2
4x4 W5.4/W5.4	102x102 MW34.9/MW34.9	119 lb/100 sf	5.82 kg/m2

=== Electro galvanized welded wire mesh with square opening ===
This type of welded wire mesh is designed for building fencing and in other infrastructural purposes. It is a corrosion resistant wire mesh that is largely used in structural building. It is also available in different forms like rolls and panels for industrial uses.

=== Hot dipped galvanized welded mesh ===
This type of mesh wire is generally made up of plain steel wire. At the time of processing it goes through a hot zinc covering process. This type of welded mesh ware with square opening is ideal for animal cage structuring, fabricating the wire boxes, grilling, partition making, grating purposes and machine protection fencing.

=== PVC coated welded mesh ===
PVC coated welded mesh with plastic covering is constructed with galvanized iron wire of high quality. It has PVC powder covering that is processed by an automatic machine. The smooth plastic coating on this corrosion protective wire is attached with a strong adhesive which make increases durability of the wire. It is used in fencing residential and official properties like gardens, parks, building etc. The PVC coated welded mesh which is available as both rolls and panels, is also available in different colors like white, black, green etc.

=== Welded stainless steel mesh ===
This kind of welded mesh wire is basically used in industrial fencing purposes. It is made up of stainless steel that has high strength and integrity. This corrosion resistance meshed wire is long lasting and is widely used in transportation, agricultural, mining, horticulture, entertainment and other service sectors.

=== Welded wire fencing ===
This is a type of meshed wire that is available in rolls or panel for used for fencing. Also referred to as "weldmesh", it is available with or without galvanization. The non-galvanized version comes for a lower cost.

=== Welded steel bar gratings ===
This type of welded mesh wire provides advantages like high strength, easy installation and feasible cost. It is mostly used for grating roads, making drainage coverings and building safety walls. It also has uses in chemical plantation, platform grating, metallurgy etc.
