= Weld quality assurance =

Weld quality assurance involves the use of technological methods and actions to test and ensure the quality of welds, and secondarily to confirm their presence, location, and coverage. In manufacturing, welds are used to join two or more metal surfaces. Because these connections may encounter loads and fatigue during product lifetime, there is a chance they may fail if not created to proper specification.

== Weld testing and analysis ==
Methods of weld testing and analysis are used to assure the quality and correctness of the weld after it is completed. This term generally refers to testing and analysis focused on the quality and strength of the weld but may refer to technological actions to check for the presence, position, and extent of welds. These are divided into destructive and non-destructive methods. A few examples of destructive testing include macro etch testing, fillet-weld break tests, transverse tension tests, and guided bend tests. Other destructive methods include acid etch testing, back bend testing, tensile strength break testing, nick break testing, and free bend testing. Non-destructive methods include fluorescent penetrate tests, magnaflux tests, eddy current (electromagnetic) tests, hydrostatic testing, tests using magnetic particles, X-rays and gamma ray-based methods, and acoustic emission techniques. Other methods include ferrite and hardness testing.

=== Imaging-based methods ===
==== Industrial Radiography ====
X-ray-based weld inspection may be manual, performed by an inspector on X-ray-based images or video, or automated using machine vision. Gamma Rays can also be used

==== Visible light imaging ====
Inspection may be manual, conducted by an inspector using imaging equipment, or automated using machine vision. Since the similarity of materials between weld and workpiece, and between good and defective areas, provides little inherent contrast, the latter usually requires methods other than simple imaging.

One (destructive) method involves the microscopic analysis of a weld cross-section.

=== Ultrasonic- and acoustic-based methods ===
Ultrasonic testing uses the principle that a gap in the weld changes the propagation of ultrasonic sound through the metal. One common method uses single-probe ultrasonic testing involving operator interpretation of an oscilloscope-type screen. Another senses using a 2D array of ultrasonic sensors. Conventional, phased array and time of flight diffraction (TOFD) methods can be combined into the same piece of test equipment.

Acoustic emission methods monitor for the sound created by the loading or flexing of the weld.

=== Peel testing of spot welds ===
This method includes tearing the weld apart and measuring the size of the remaining weld.

== Weld monitoring ==
Weld monitoring methods ensure the weld's quality and correctness during welding. The term is generally applied to automated monitoring for weld-quality purposes and secondarily for process-control purposes such as vision-based robot guidance. Visual weld monitoring is also performed during the welding process.

On vehicular applications, weld monitoring aims to enable improvements in the quality, durability, and safety of vehicles – with cost savings in the avoidance of recalls to fix the large proportion of systemic quality problems that arise from suboptimal welding. Quality monitoring of automatic welding can save production downtime and reduce the need for product reworking and recall.

Industrial monitoring systems encourage high production rates and reduce scrap costs.

=== Inline coherent imaging ===
Inline coherent imaging (ICI) is a recently developed interferometric technique based on optical coherence tomography that is used for quality assurance of keyhole laser beam welding, a welding method that is gaining popularity in a variety of industries. ICI aims a low-powered broadband light source through the same optical path as the primary welding laser. The beam enters the keyhole of the weld and is reflected back into the head optics by the bottom of the keyhole. An interference pattern is produced by combining the reflected light with a separate beam that has traveled through a path of a known distance. This interference pattern is then analyzed to obtain a precise measurement of the depth of the keyhole. Because these measurements are acquired in real-time, ICI can also be used to control the laser penetration depth by using the depth measurement in a feedback loop that modulates the laser's output power.

=== Transient thermal analysis method ===
Transient thermal analysis is used for range of weld optimization tasks.

=== Signature image processing method ===
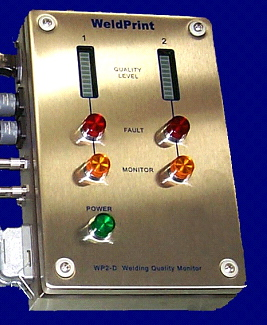
A WeldPrint analyzer, which uses SIP for the industrial analysis of weld quality

Signature image processing (SIP) is a technology for analyzing electrical data collected from welding processes. Acceptable welding requires exact conditions; variations in conditions can render a weld unacceptable. SIP allows the identification of welding faults in real time, measures the stability of welding processes, and enables the optimization of welding processes.

==== Development ====
The idea of using electrical data analyzed by algorithms to assess the quality of the welds produced in robotic manufacturing emerged in 1995 from research by Associate Professor Stephen Simpson at the University of Sydney on the complex physical phenomena that occur in welding arcs. Simpson realized that a way of determining the quality of a weld could be developed without a definitive understanding of those phenomena. The development involved:

1. a method for handling sampled data blocks by treating them as phase-space portrait signatures with appropriate image processing. Typically, one second's worth of sampled welding voltage and current data are collected from GMAW pulse or short arc welding processes. The data is converted to a 2D histogram, and signal-processing operations such as image smoothing are performed.
2. a technique for analyzing welding signatures based on statistical methods from the social sciences, such as principal component analysis. The relationship between the welding voltage and the current reflects the state of the welding process, and the signature image includes this information. Comparing signatures quantitatively using principal component analysis allows for the spread of signature images, enabling faults to be detected and identified The system includes algorithms and mathematics appropriate for real-time welding analysis on personal computers, and the multidimensional optimization of fault-detection performance using experimental welding data. Comparing signature images from moment to moment in a weld provides a useful estimate of how stable the welding process is. "Through-the-arc" sensing, by comparing signature images when the physical parameters of the process change, leads to quantitative estimates—for example, of the position of the weld bead.

Unlike systems that log information for later study or use X-rays or ultrasound to check samples, SIP technology looks at the electrical signal and detects faults when they occur. Data blocks of 4,000 points of electrical data are collected four times a second and converted to signature images. After image processing operations, statistical analyses of the signatures provide a quantitative assessment of the welding process, revealing its stability and reproducibility and providing fault detection and process diagnostics. A similar approach, using voltage-current histograms and a simplified statistical measure of distance between signature images, has been evaluated for tungsten inert gas (TIG) welding by researchers from Osaka University.

==== Industrial application ====
SIP provides the basis for the WeldPrint system, which consists of a front-end interface and software based on the SIP engine and relies on electrical signals alone. It is designed to be non-intrusive and sufficiently robust to withstand harsh industrial welding environments. The first major purchaser of the technology, GM Holden provided feedback that allowed the system to be refined in ways that increased its industrial and commercial value. Improvements in the algorithms, including multiple parameter optimization with a server network, have led to an order-of-magnitude improvement in fault-detection performance over the past five years.

The technology in use on the shop floor of Melbourne firm Unidrive, which used WeldPrint to monitor the quality of steering-column component welds in more than half a million Australian vehicles in the period 2001–06

WeldPrint for arc welding became available in mid-2001. About 70 units have been deployed since 2001, about 90% used on the shop floors of automotive manufacturing companies and their suppliers. Industrial users include Lear (UK), Unidrive, GM Holden, Air International and QTB Automotive (Australia). Units have been leased to Australian companies such as Rheem, Dux, and OneSteel for welding evaluation and process improvement.

The WeldPrint software received the Brother business software of the year award (2001); in 2003, the technology received the A$100,000 inaugural Australasian Peter Doherty Prize for Innovation; and WTi, the University of Sydney's original spin-off company, received an AusIndustry Certificate of Achievement in recognition of the development.

SIP has opened opportunities for researchers to use it as a measurement tool both in welding and in related disciplines, such as structural engineering. Research opportunities have opened up in the application of biomonitoring of external EEGs, where SIP offers advantages in interpreting the complex signals

==== Weld mapping ====
Weld mapping is the process of assigning information to a weld repair or joint to enable easy identification of weld processes, production (welders, their qualifications, date welded), quality (visual inspection, NDT, standards and specifications) and traceability (tracking weld joints and welded castings, the origin of weld materials). Weld mapping should also incorporate a pictorial identification to represent the weld number on the fabrication drawing or casting repair. Military, nuclear and commercial industries possess unique quality standards (e.g., ISO, CEN, ASME, ASTM, AWS, NAVSEA) which direct weld mapping procedures and specifications, both in metal casting in which defects are removed and filled in via GTAW (TIG welding) or SMAW (stick welding) processes, or fabrication of weld joints which primarily involves GMAW (MIG welding).

== See also ==
- Welding defect
- Industrial radiography
- Robot welding
- Pipeline and Hazardous Materials Safety Administration
