= Filler metal =

Metal added to join two other metal parts

In metalworking, a filler metal is a metal added in the making of a joint through welding, brazing, or soldering.

== Soldering ==
Soldering and brazing processes rely on a filler metal added to the joint to form the junction between the base metal parts. Soft soldering uses a filler that melts at a lower temperature than the workpiece, often a lead-tin solder alloy. Brazing and hard soldering use a higher temperature filler that melts at a temperature which may approach that of the base metal, and which may form a eutectic alloy with the base metal.

Filler alloys have a lower melting point than the base metal, so that the joint may be made by bringing the whole assembly up to temperature without everything melting as one. Complex joints, typically for jewelry or live steam boilermaking, may be made in stages, with filler metals of progressively lower melting points used in turn. Early joints are thus not destroyed by heating to the later temperatures.

== Welding ==
Welding processes work around the melting point of the base metal and require the base metal itself to begin melting. They usually require more precise distribution of heat from a small torch, as melting the entire workpiece is avoided by controlling the distribution of heat over space, rather than limiting the maximum heat. If filler is used, it is of a similar alloy and melting point to the base metal.

Not all welding processes require filler metal. Autogenous welding processes only require part of the existing base metal to be melted and this is sufficient, provided that the joint is already mechanically close-fitting before welding. Forge- or hammer welding uses hammering to close up the hot joint and also to locally increase its heat.

Many gas welding processes, such as lead burning, are typically autogenous and a separate wire filler rod of the same metal is only added if there is a gap to fill. Some metals, such as lead or Birmabright aluminium alloy, use offcut strips of the same metal as filler. Steels are usually welded with a filler alloy made specially for the purpose. To prevent rusting in storage, these wires are often lightly copper plated.

With electric arc welding, a major use for the filler rod is as a consumable electrode that also generates heat in the workpiece. An electrical discharge from this electrode provides heat that melts both the electrode and heats the base metal.

TIG welding is an electric welding process that uses a non-consumed tungsten electrode to provide heat, with the filler rod added manually. This is more like gas welding as a process, but with a different heat source.

== Hardfacing ==
A specialist use for filler metal is where a deliberately different metal is to be deposited. This is often done for hardfacing excavating tools or digger bucket teeth. A hard, but more expensive and sometimes brittle, facing alloy is deposited onto the wear surfaces of mild steel tools.

Four types of filler metals exist—covered electrodes, bare electrode wire or rod, tubular electrode wire, and welding fluxes. Sometimes non-consumable electrodes are included as well, but since these metals are not consumed by the welding process, they are normally excluded.

== Usage ==
=== Covered electrodes ===
Covered electrodes are used extensively in shielded metal arc welding and are a major factor in that method's popularity.

=== Bare electrode wires ===
Bare electrode wires are used in gas metal arc welding and bare electrode rods are used in gas tungsten arc welding.

=== Tubular electrode wires ===
Tubular electrode wire is used in flux-cored arc welding.

=== Welding fluxes ===
Welding fluxes are used in submerged arc welding.

== See also ==
- Amorphous brazing foil
- Autogenous welding, welding processes without filler
