= ABF =

ABF may refer to:

== Organizations ==
- ABF Freight System, an American company
- Africa Badminton Federation
- American Bar Foundation, a legal research institute
- Arbetarnas bildningsförbund, Swedish for "Workers' Educational Association"
- Argentina Boxing Federation
- Army Benevolent Fund, of the British Army
- Artists' Benevolent Fund, a UK charity
- Associated British Foods, a British multinational
- Australian Baseball Federation
- Australian Border Force

== Other uses ==
- Abai Sungai language, an Austronesian language of Malaysia
- Abaiang Airport in Gilbert Islands, Kiribati (IATA airport code ABF)
- Academy for Business and Finance, part of high school Bergen County Academies in New Jersey, US
- Ammonium bifluoride
- Amorphous brazing foil
- Applications-By-Forms, a component of CA-OpenIngres
- Availability-based tariff
- Aviation boatswain's mate, fuels
