= Rover P4 =

British mid-size luxury car series made 1949–1964

Rover P4 series
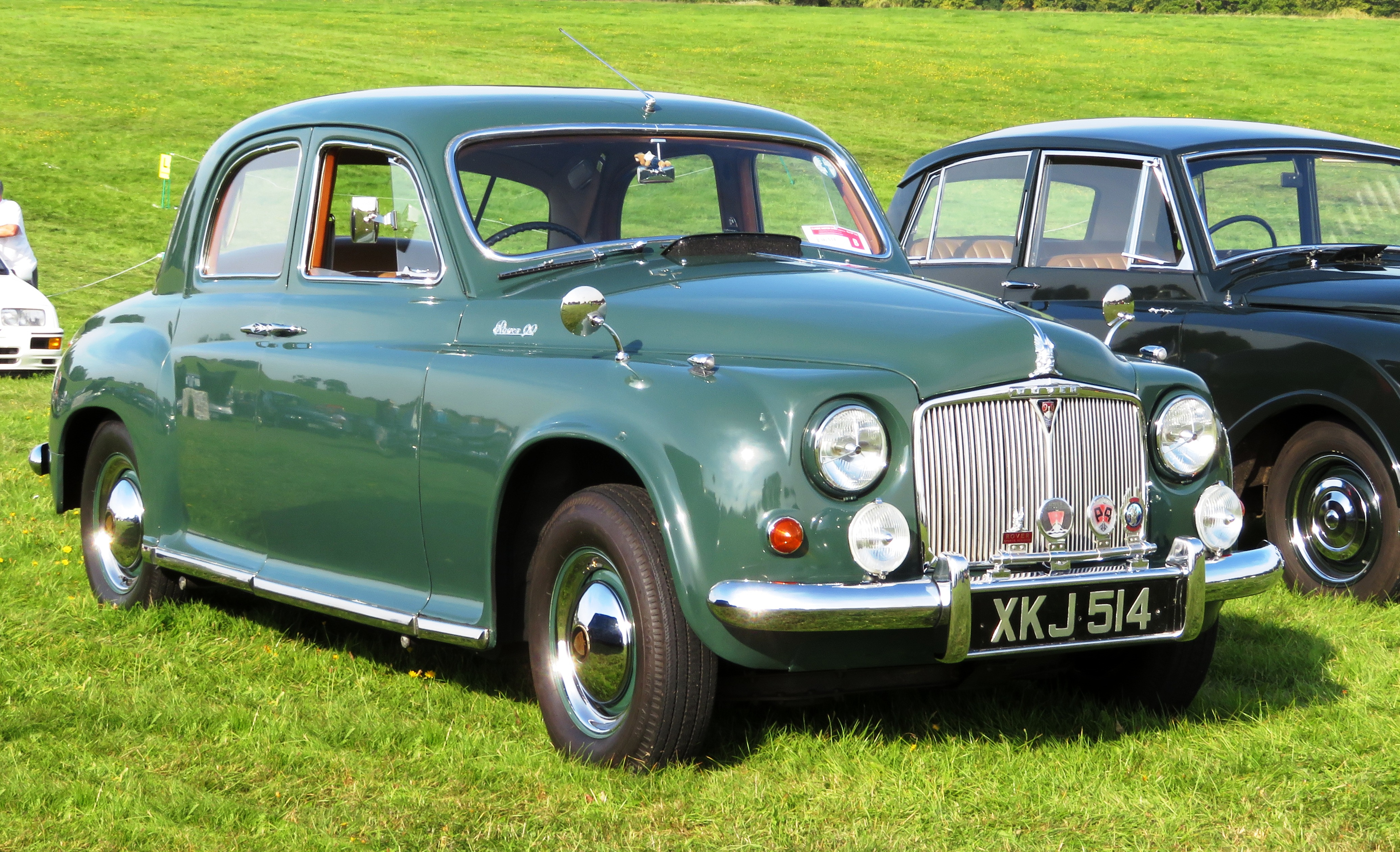
- 1956 Rover 90

Overview
- Manufacturer: The Rover Co. Ltd.
- Production: 1949–1964; 130,312 units
- Assembly: United Kingdom: Solihull
- Designer: Gordon Bashford

Body and chassis
- Class: Mid-size luxury car
- Body style: 4-door saloon
- Layout: FR layout

Dimensions
- Wheelbase: 111 in (2,819 mm)
- Length: 178.25 in (4,528 mm)
- Width: 65.6 in (1,666 mm)
- Height: 63.25 in (1,607 mm)

Chronology
- Predecessor: Rover P3
- Successor: Rover P5 (concurrent from 1958); Rover P6

The Rover P4 series is a group of mid-size luxury saloon cars produced by the Rover Company from 1949 until 1964. They were designed by Gordon Bashford.

The P4 designation is factory terminology for this group of cars and was not in day-to-day use by ordinary owners who would have used the appropriate consumer designations for their models such as Rover 90 or Rover 100.

Production began in 1949 with the 6-cylinder 2.1-litre Rover 75. Four years later a 2-litre 4-cylinder Rover 60 was brought to the market to fit below the 75 and a 2.6-litre 6-cylinder Rover 90 to top the three-car range. Several variations followed.

These cars are very much part of British culture and became known as the 'Auntie' Rovers. They were driven by royalty including Grace Kelly and King Hussein of Jordan whose first car was a 1952 75.

The P4 series was supplemented in September 1958 by a new Rover 3-litre P5 but the P4 series stayed in production until 1964 and their replacement by the Rover 2000.

== Engineering ==
The earlier cars used a Rover engine from the 1948 Rover 75. A four-speed manual transmission was used with a column-mounted gear change at first and floor-mounted unit from September 1953. At first the gearbox only had synchromesh on third and top but it was added to second gear as well in 1953. A freewheel clutch, a traditional Rover feature, was fitted to cars without overdrive until mid-1959, when it was removed from the specifications, shortly before the London Motor Show in October that year.

The cars had a separate chassis with independent suspension by coil springs at the front and a live axle with half-elliptical leaf springs at the rear. The brakes on early cars were operated by a hybrid hydro-mechanical system but became fully hydraulic in 1950. Girling disc brakes replaced drums at the front from October 1959.

The complete body shells were made by the Pressed Steel company and featured aluminium/magnesium alloy (Birmabright) doors, boot lid and bonnets. If the handle was not used to close them they were easily dented so for the final 95/110 models steel was used instead. The P4 series was one of the last UK cars to incorporate rear-hinged "suicide" doors.

== Rover 75 ==
Rover 75
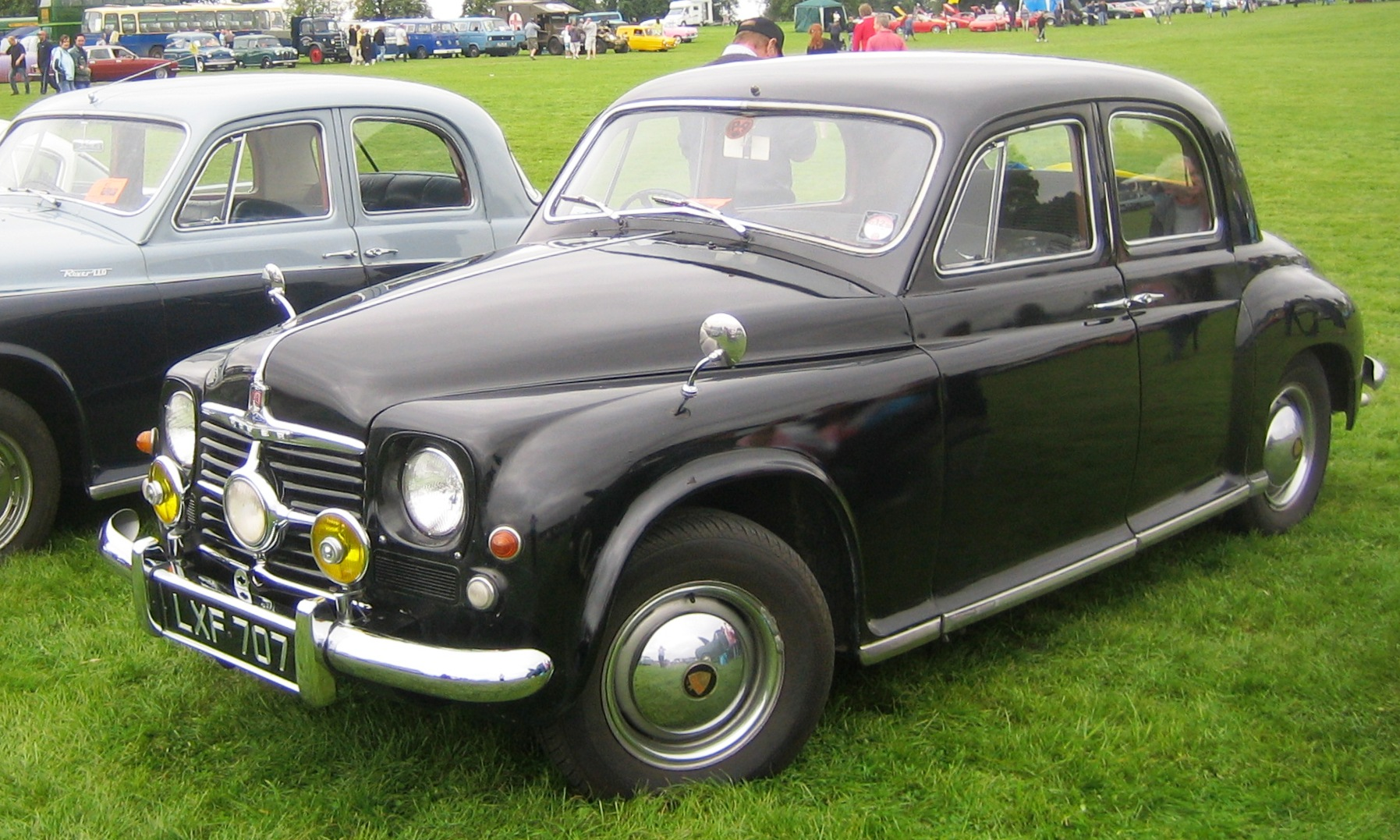
- 75 with central headlight registered December 1950

Overview
- Production: 1949–1954 (33,267 produced); 1955–1959 (9.974 produced)

Body and chassis
- Body style: 4-door saloon

Powertrain
- Engine: 2103 cc IOE engine I6; 2230 cc IOE engine I6

Dimensions
- Wheelbase: 110"
- Length: 171.25"

Chronology
- Predecessor: Rover 75 (P3)
- Successor: Rover 80 (see below); Rover 100 (see below)

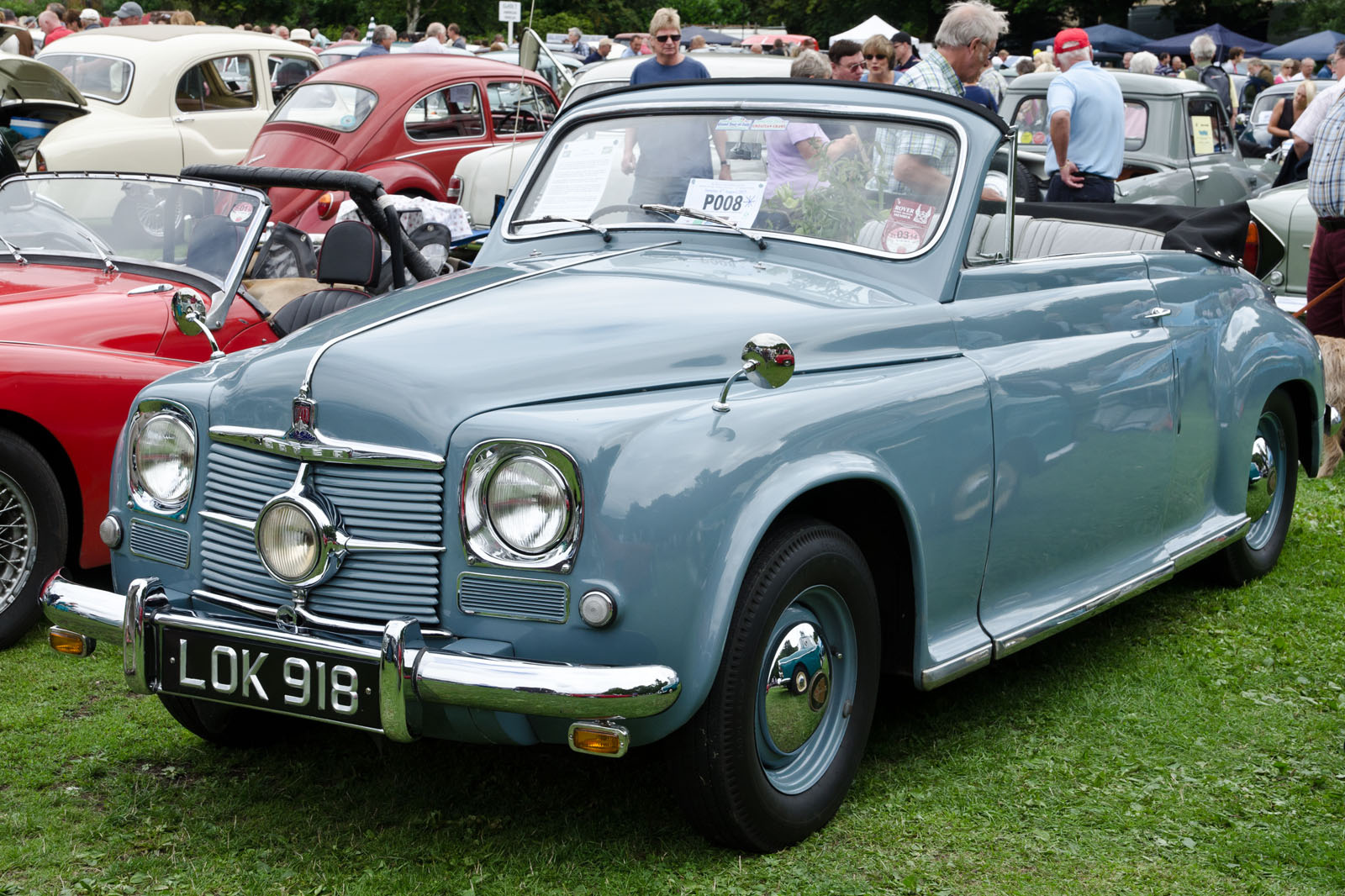
Tickford drophead coupé registered July 1951

Announced by Managing Director Spencer Wilks on 23 September 1949 the new Rover 75, then the only Rover in production, was first displayed at the opening day of the Earls Court Motor Show on 28 September 1949. It featured unusual modern styling in stark contrast with the outdated Rover 75 (P3) it replaced. Gone were the traditional radiator, separate headlamps and external running boards. In their place were a chromium grille, recessed headlamps and a streamlined body the whole width of the chassis. A steering column-mounted gear lever was fitted.

The car's styling was derived from the then controversial 1947 Studebakers. The Rover executives purchased two such vehicles and fitted the body from one of them to a prototype P4 chassis to create a development mule. James Taylor's book 'Rover P4 – The Complete Story' says that this vehicle was affectionately known as the 'Roverbaker' hybrid.

Malcolm Bobbit states "The P4 set the seal on the future with a vengeance. Rover defied its critics with the P4's new look and to get some idea of the shock of the new, consider some of its rivals ... astonishment at the P4's courageous styling." The P3 had almost no boot at all yet that had been considered rather more than adequate. The new car's bonnet-like extension to its rear was ridiculed; the driver sat well forward looking out over a relatively short bonnet and the rear wheels were set well back behind the back seat. All the new car's proportions were different from all the other new cars.

Another distinctive feature of the Rover 75 was the centrally mounted light in the grille, where most other manufacturers of good quality cars provided a pair – one fog and one driving light – often separately mounted behind the bumper. Known as the "Cyclops eye", this did not catch on and was discontinued in the new grille announced on 23 October 1952.

Power came from a more powerful version of the previous model's 2.1 L (2103 cc/128 in³) Rover IOE straight-6 engine now with chromium-plated cylinder bores, an aluminium cylinder head with built-in induction manifold and a pair of horizontal instead of downdraught carburetters. A four-speed manual transmission was used with a column-mounted gear lever which was replaced by a floor-mounted mechanism in September 1953.

A car tested by The Motor magazine in 1949 had a top speed of 83.5 mph (134.4 km/h) and could accelerate from 0–60 mph (97 km/h) in 21.6 seconds. A fuel consumption of 27.8 miles per imperial gallon (10.2 L/100 km; 23.1 mpg_{‑US}) was recorded. The test car cost £1106 including taxes. The turning circle was 37 feet (11 m).

=== Road & Track ===
"... and I honestly believe (barring the Rolls-Royce) that there is no finer car built in the world today." Bob Dearborn, Tester, Road & Track. Road test no. F-4-52, August 1952.

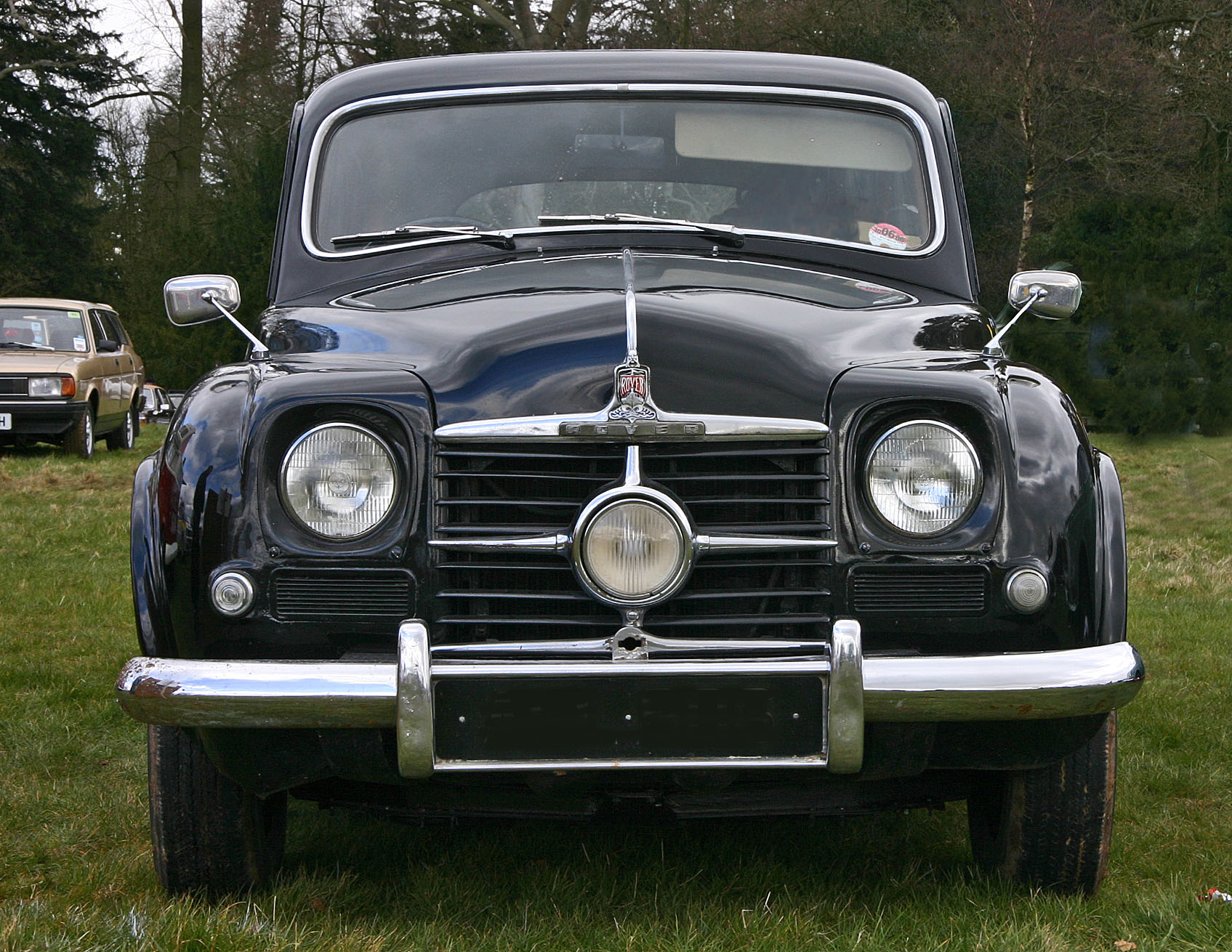
"Cyclops" (1949–1952)

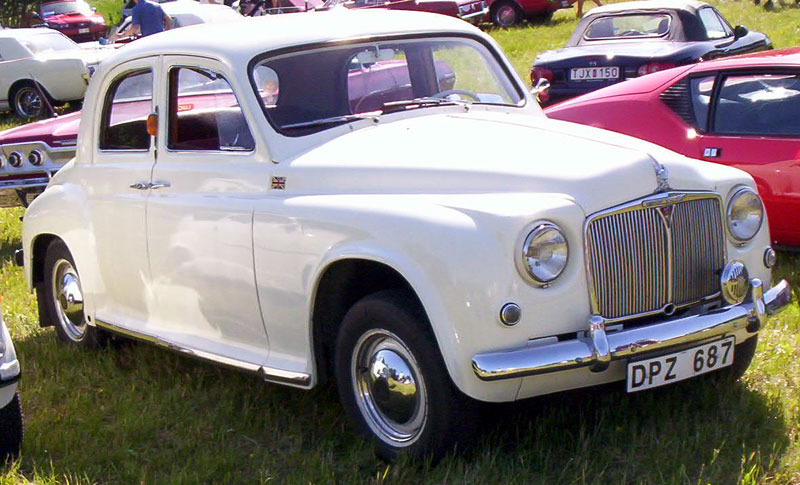
Revised grille (1952)

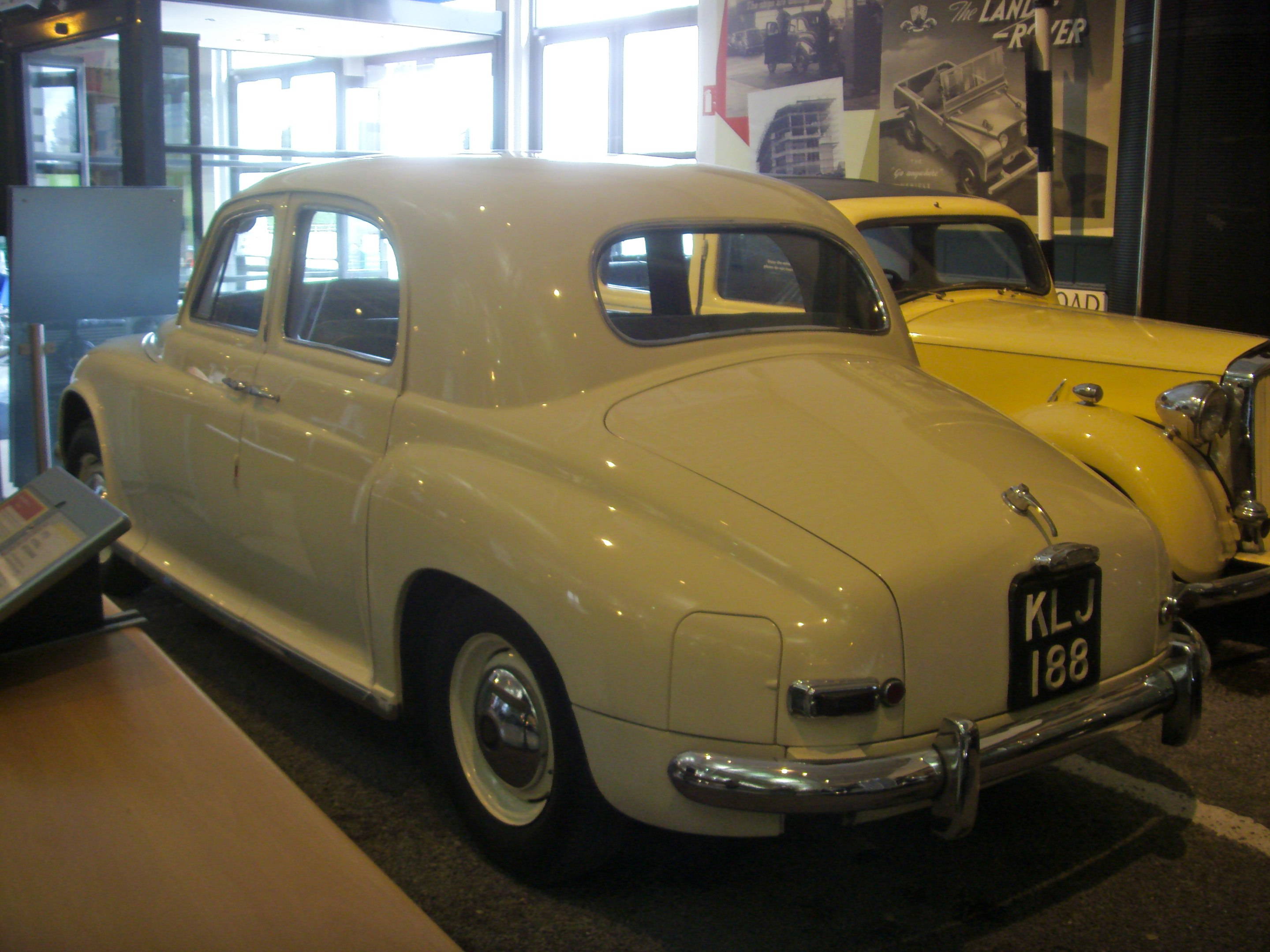
Controversial "Ducktail" (1949–1954)

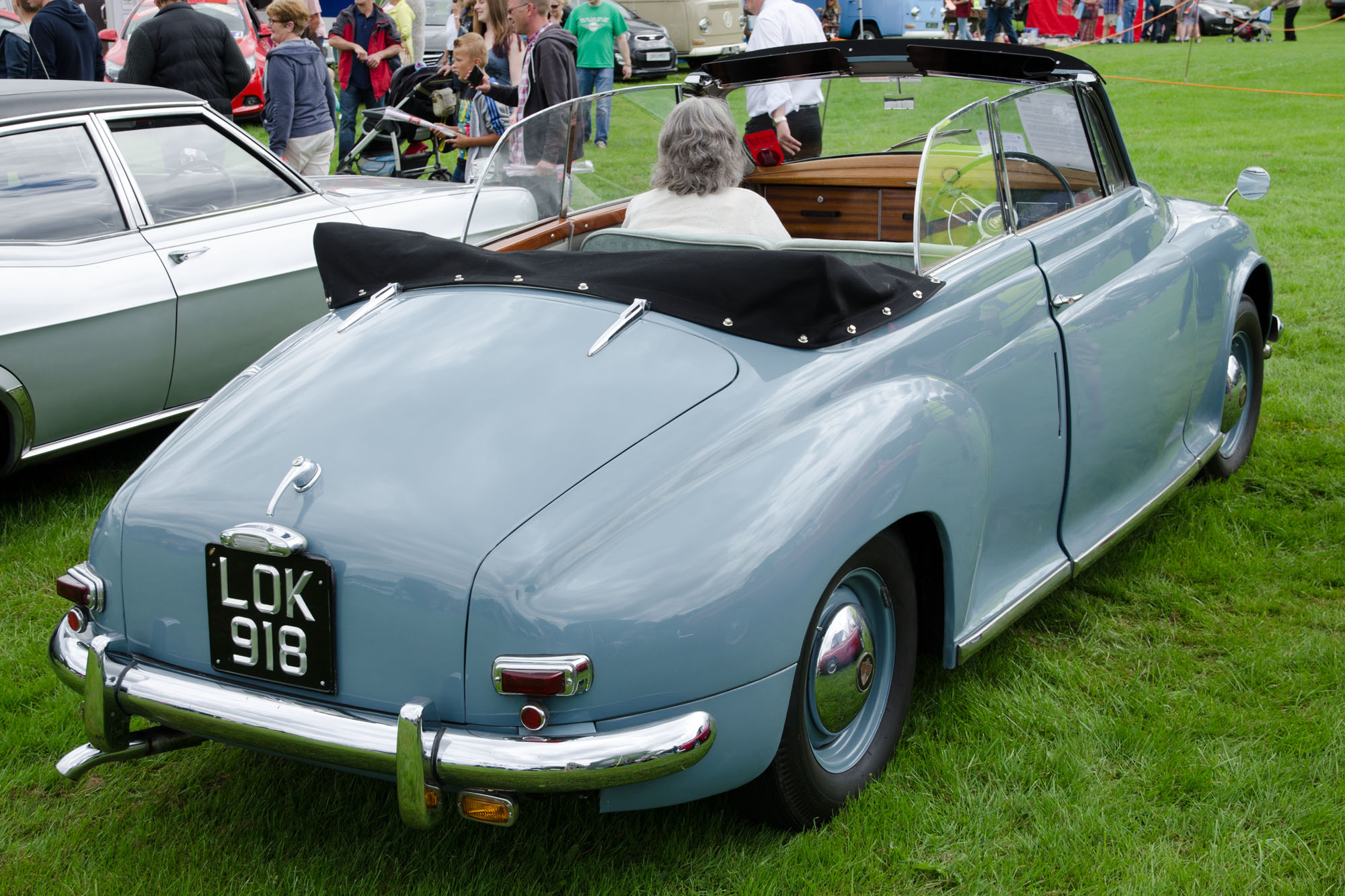
Drophead by Tickford (1950)

=== Broader range ===
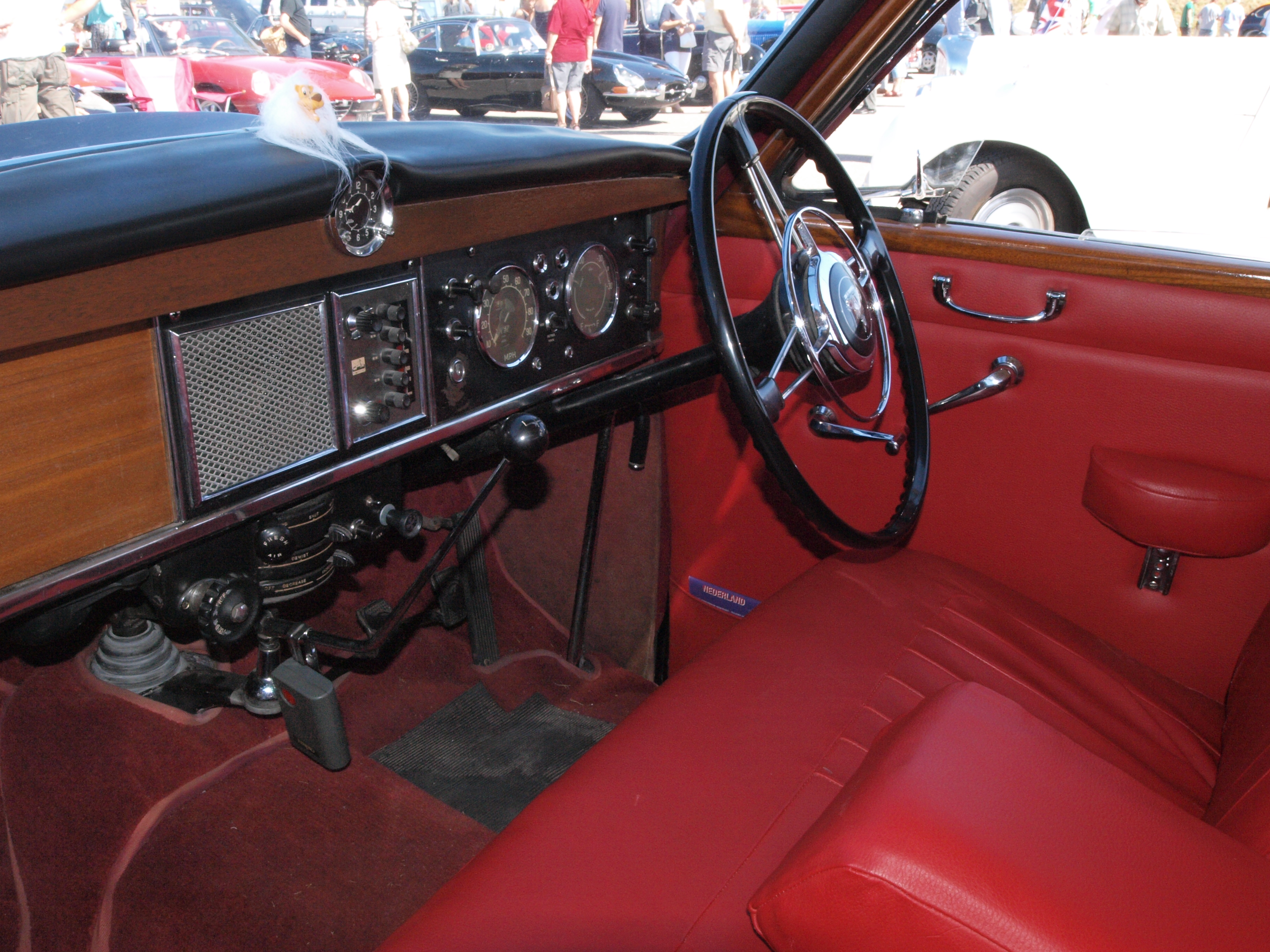
The complex linkage of the central gearlever and by the driver's right knee the shepherd's crook handbrake

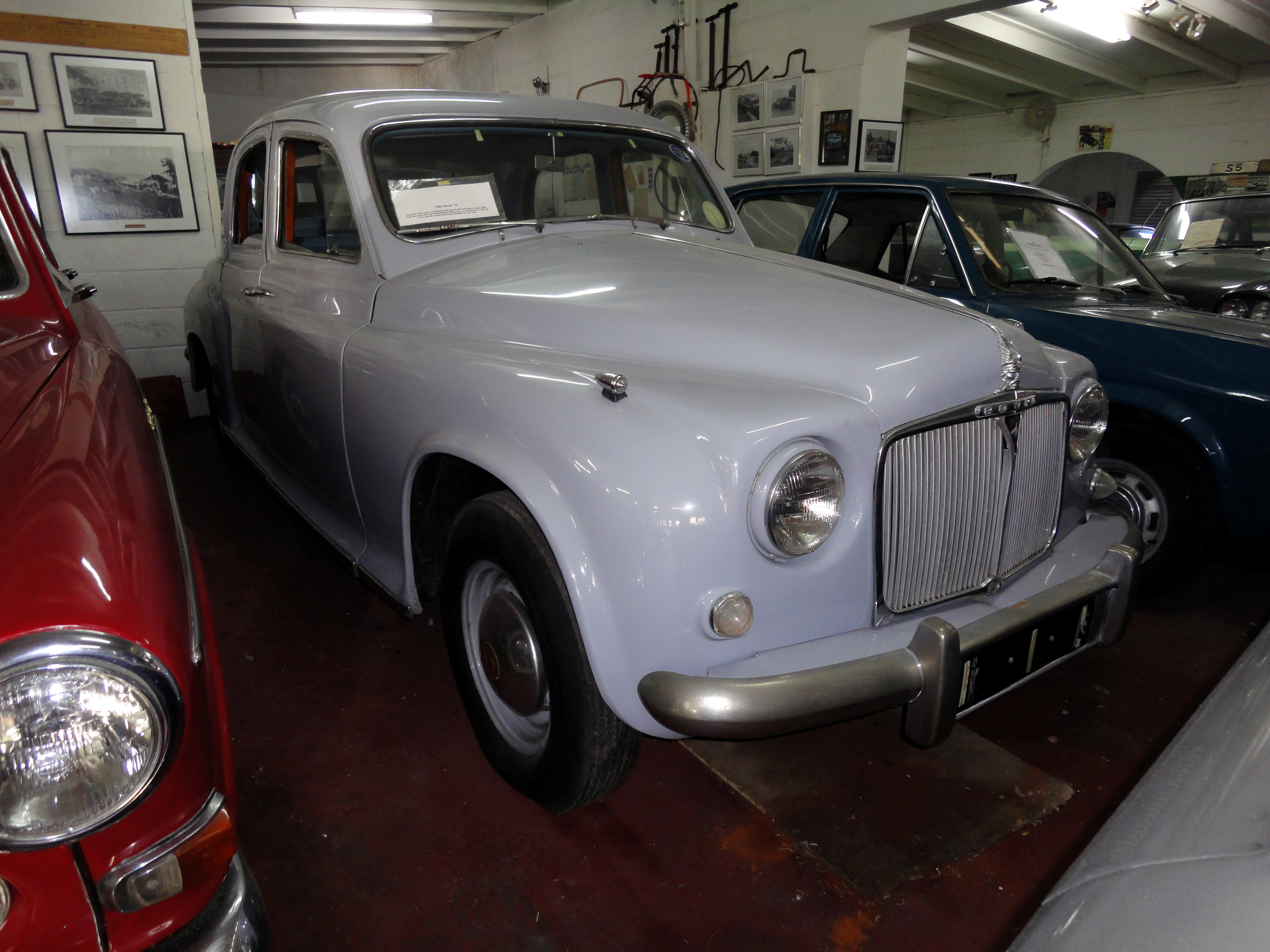
Top mounted side lights

After four years of the one model policy Rover returned to a range of the one car but three different sized engines. In September 1953 it announced it would supply a four-cylinder Rover 60 and a 2.6-litre Rover 90 adding them to the 75's 2.1-litre six. Rover's stated intention was "to cater for a wider field of motorists who require a quality car with varying degrees of economical running costs and performance".

On the same day there were modifications announced which were accordingly shared by all three:

- a curved central gear change lever. This was Rover's response to the dislike of many motorists for the steering column gear change with its complex linkages. The shape of the new lever still allowed three people to make use of the front bench seat.
- parking lights were mounted on top of the front mudguards, the disused apertures below were used for reflectors – and later for traffic indicators.

Rover also announced an all-round reduction in Rover and Land-Rover prices. This was a response to a slump in both home and export sales of all British cars.
The 2.103 litres (128.3 cu in) IOE engine continued.

=== New engine ===
The Rover 75 engine was enlarged in October 1954 to a 2.2 L (2230 cc/136 in³) version of the IOE engine.

=== Bigger boot ===
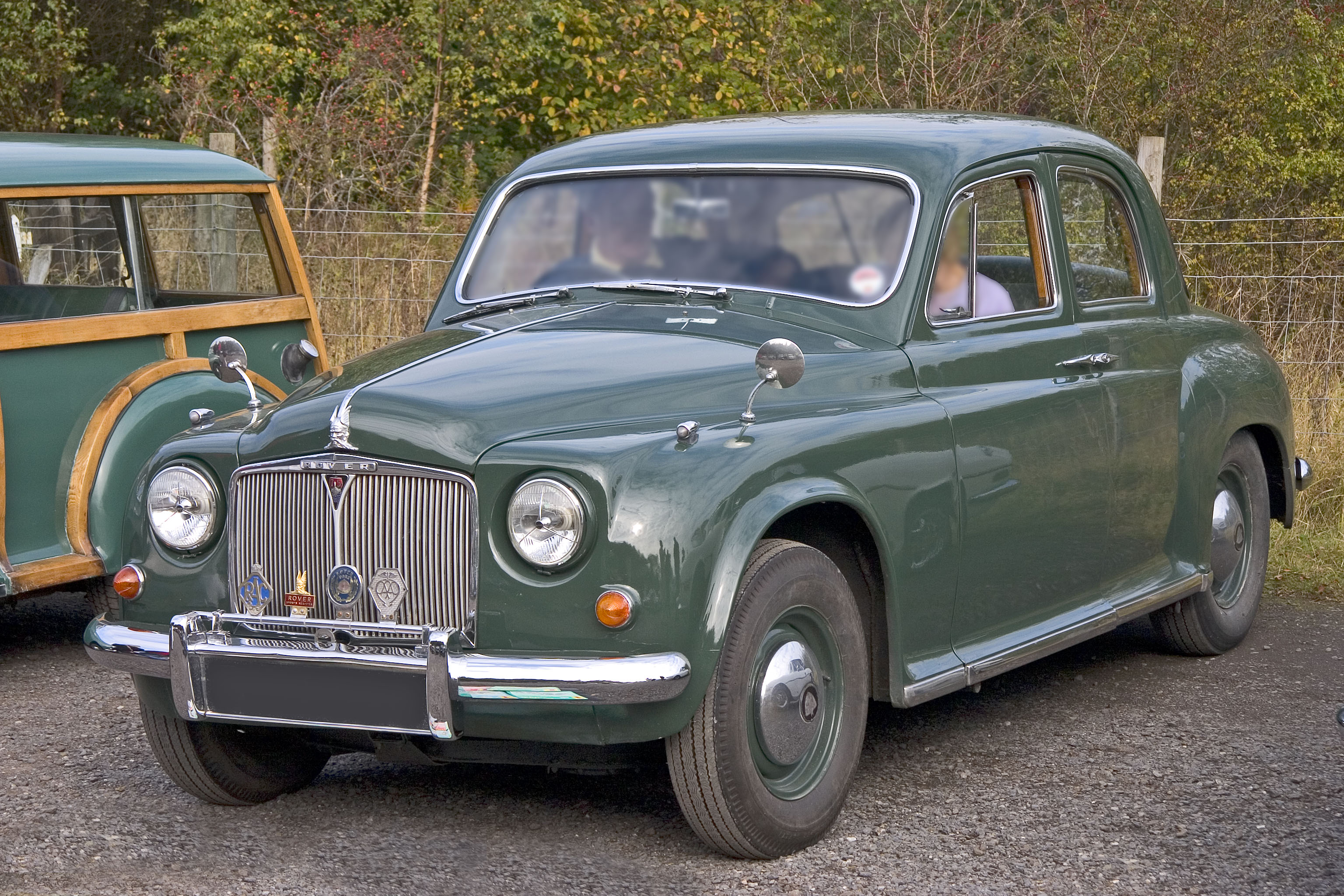
Big boot, big back window, no trafficators

An updated body for all Rovers was announced on 7 October 1954 with major styling changes by David Bache

- the boot was substantially enlarged by raising the car's hindquarters
- a broad three-piece wraparound rear window was provided
- flashing orange direction indicator lights positioned at the front where there had been reflectors and in the redesigned rear light clusters replaced trafficators in the door pillars.

At the same time Rover's chairman revealed a new factory was being built to double Land-Rover production.

=== Separate seats ===
In September 1955 the choice of a different style of front seat, two individual seats independently adjustable, was made available on all three cars at extra cost.

=== Revised front mudguards ===
The line of the front mudguards "which", said The Times, "previously gave the car a somewhat blunt appearance" was rearranged with the side lamps and flashing indicators in different positions. A small chrome reflector on the headlamp rim allowed the driver to know the side lights were functioning. Overdrive was made an option. These amendments were announced on 11 September 1956.

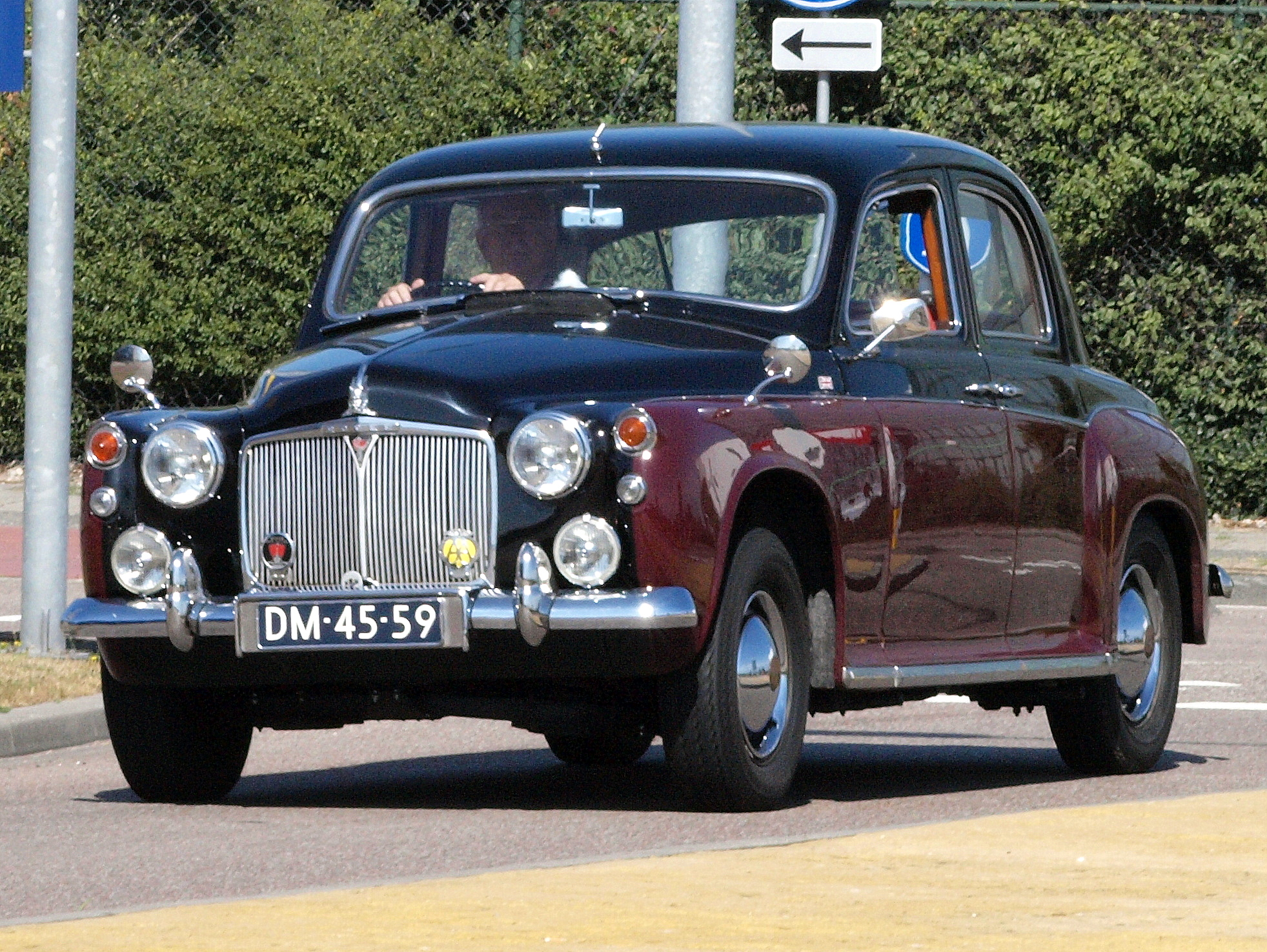
New front mudguards

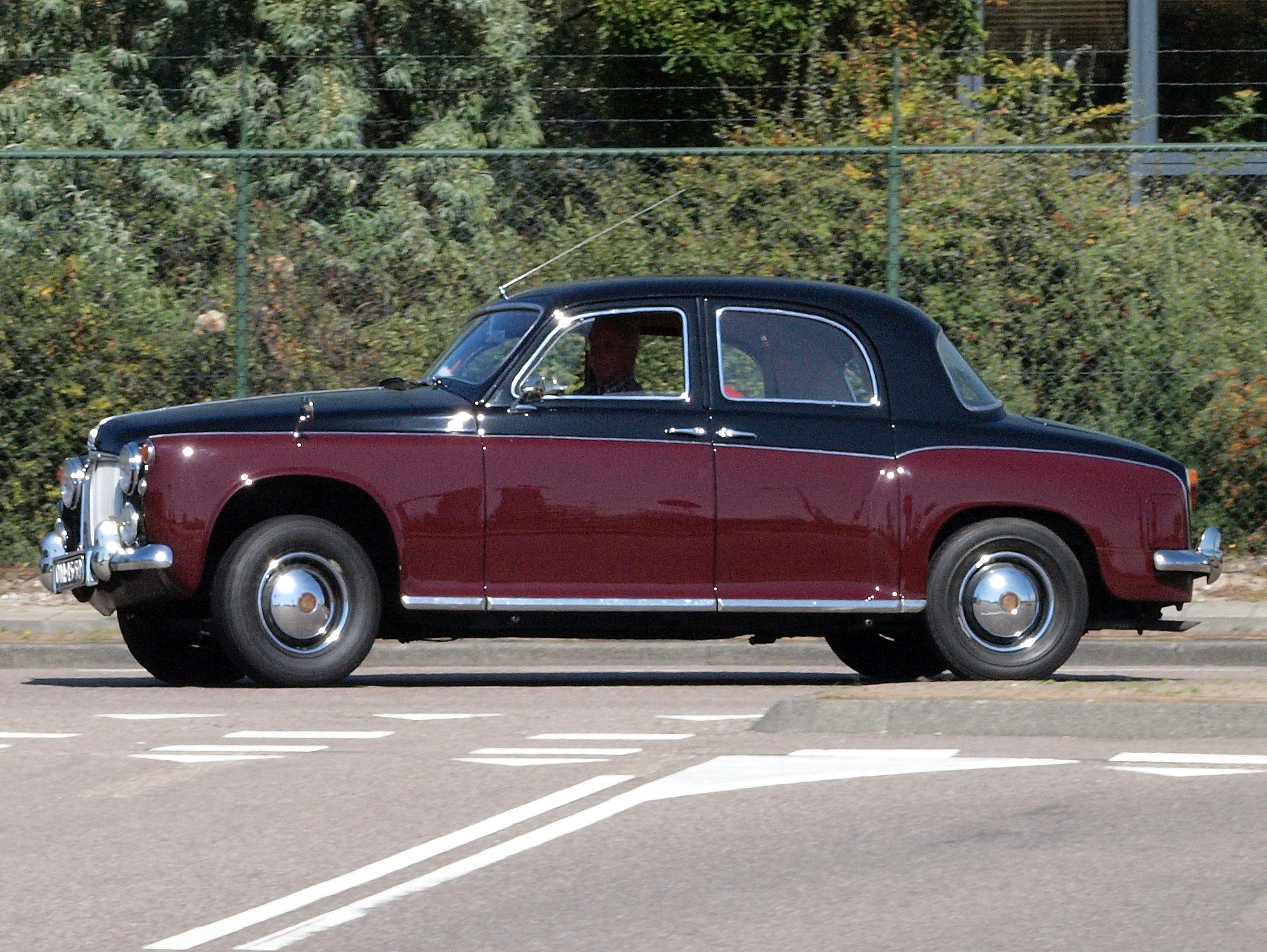
bigger boot

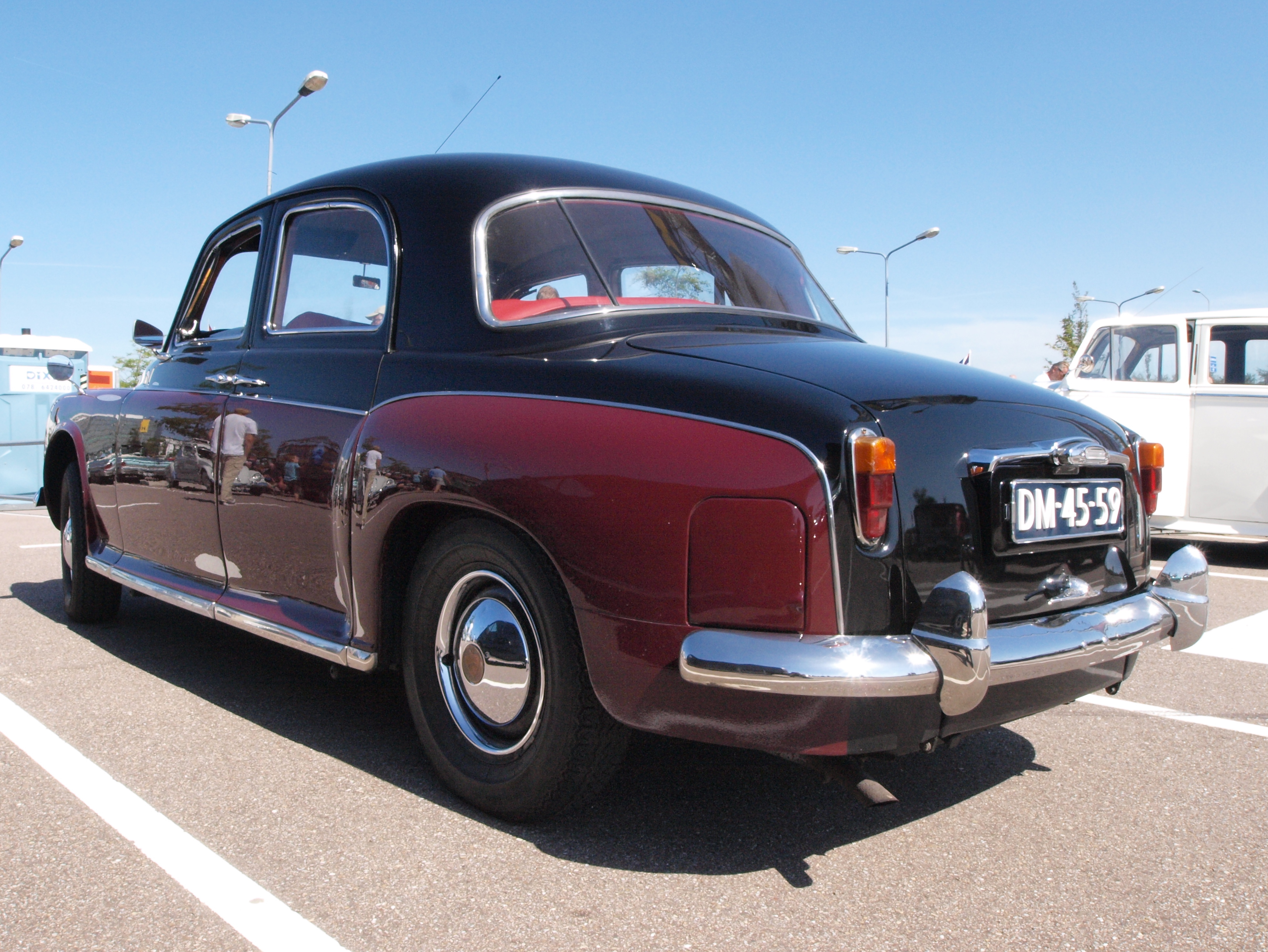
three-piece rear window

== Rover 60 ==
Rover 60
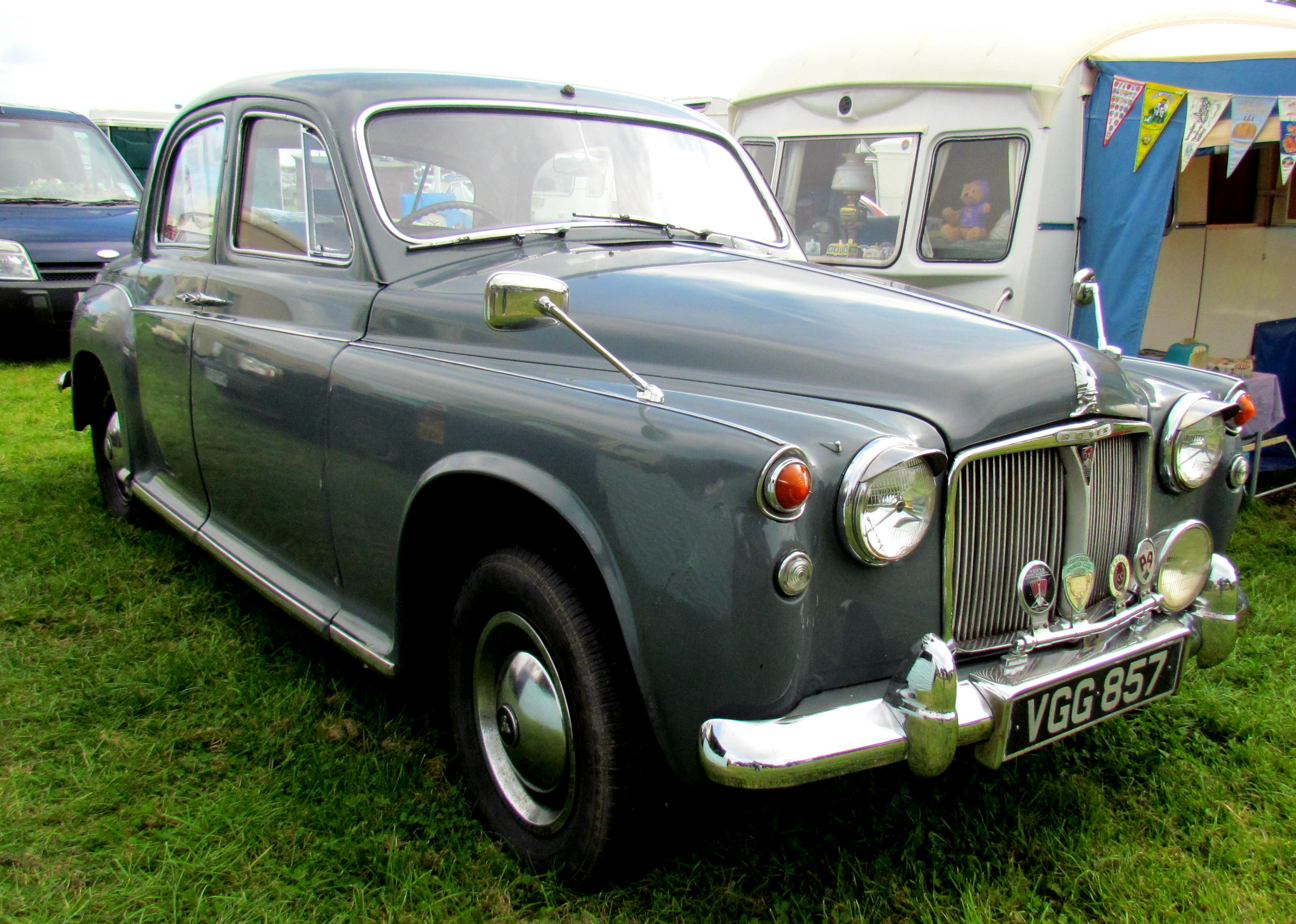
- registered October 1958

Overview
- Production: 1953–1959; 9,666 produced

Body and chassis
- Body style: 4-door saloon

Powertrain
- Engine: 2.0 L Rover IOE engine I4

Chronology
- Successor: Rover 80 (see below)

The Rover 60 was announced on 24 September 1953 to add a more economical four-cylinder engine to Rover's range though leaving trim and equipment the same as the 75 and the new Rover 90 announced at the same time. Rover's idiosyncratic central gear change lever designed to allow three-abreast seating in front was used for this new car. Its 2.0 L (1997 cc/121 in³) 60 bhp (45 kW) engine had been used in the early Land Rover though it now had modifications including an SU carburettor. As the block was shorter than that of the 6-cylinder engine, it sat further back in the frame, and this is sometimes held to have resulted in better handling and compensated for the lack of power.

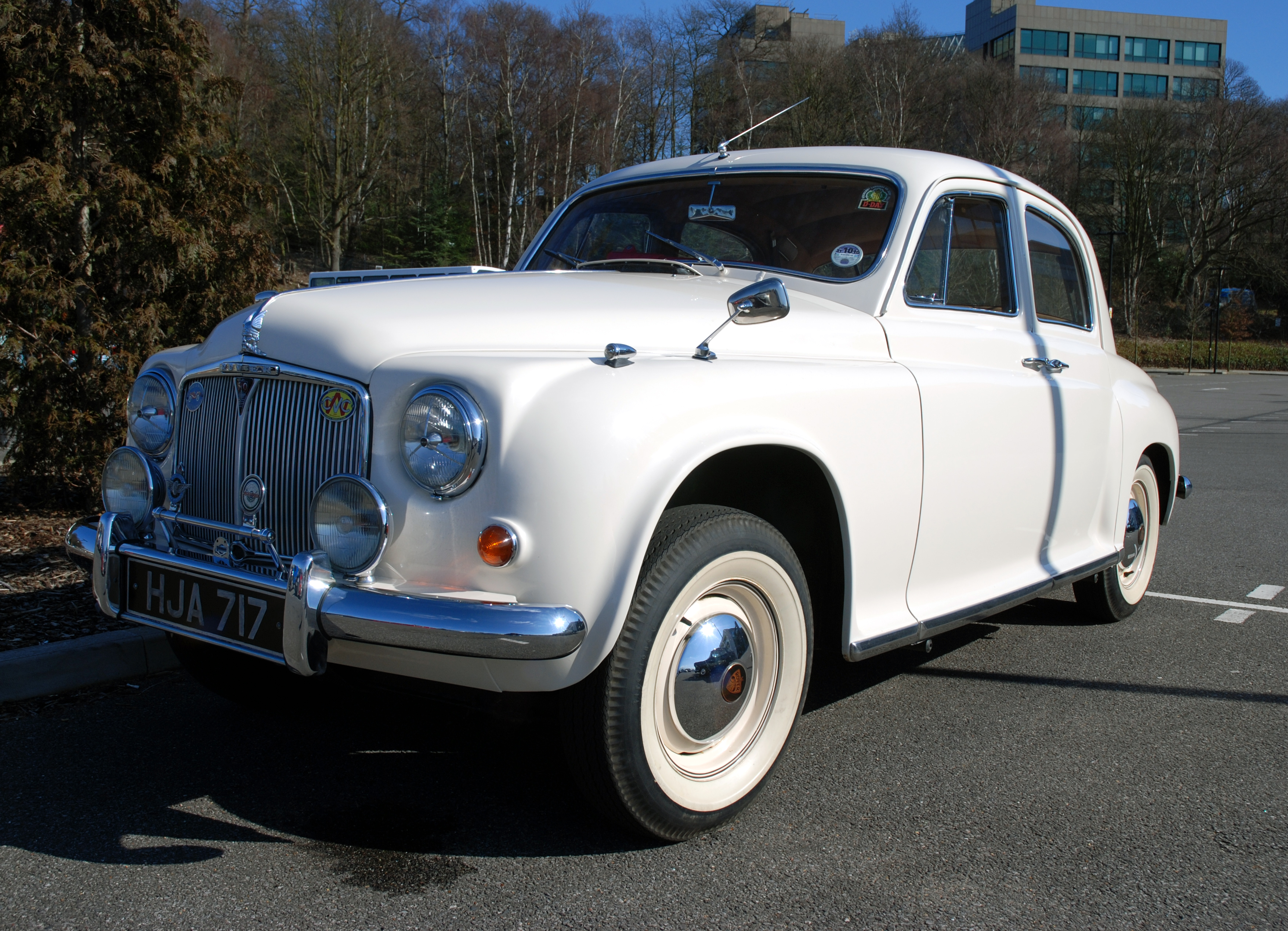
original

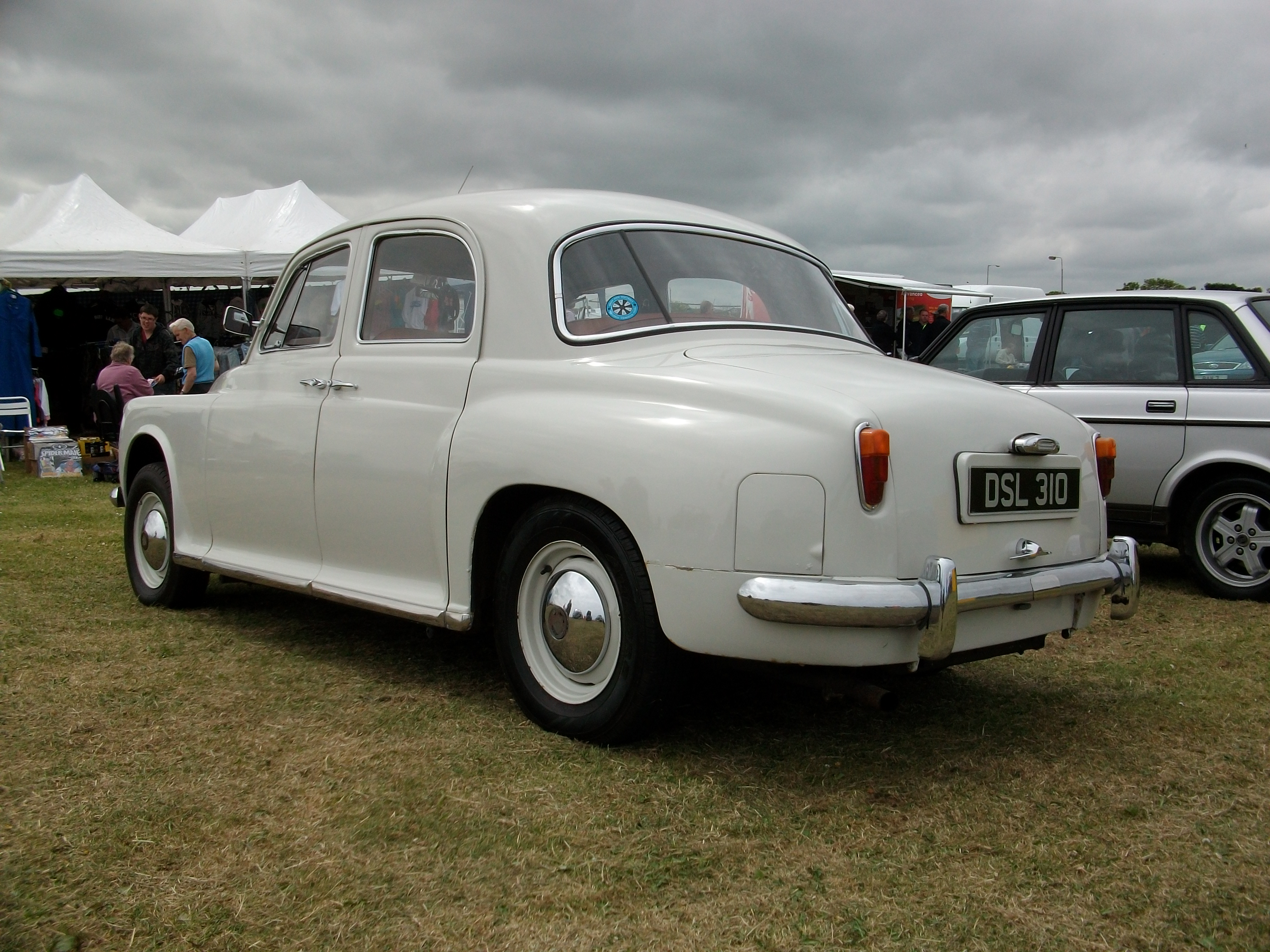
bigger boot

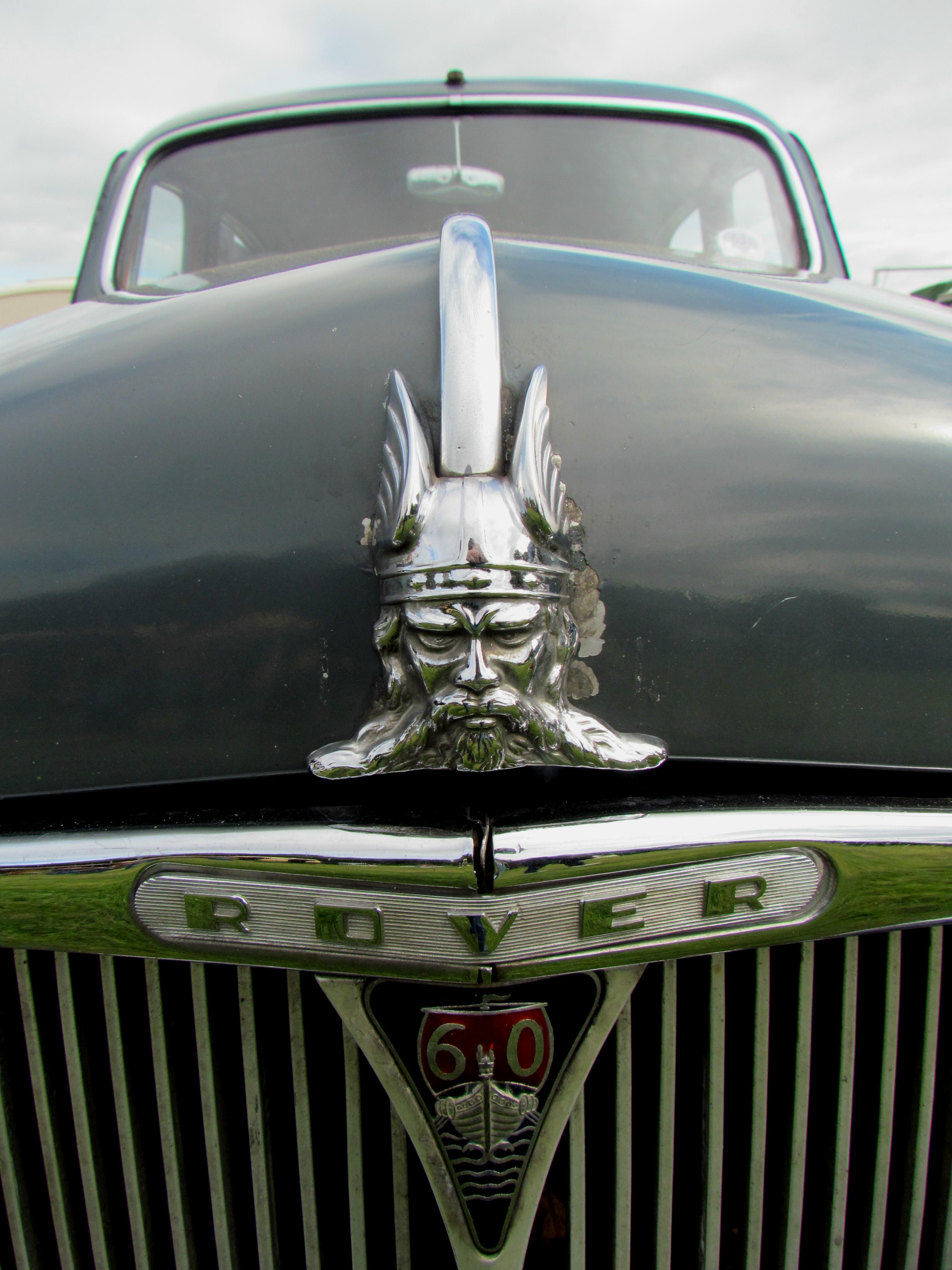

The Rover 60 shared with the Rover 75 and Rover 90 the October 1954 modifications: a bigger boot, wide rear window and flashing directions indicators all announced at the Paris Motor Show. Independently adjustable separate front seats were made available at extra cost from September 1955.

In the same way Rover 60 buyers were given the choice of a different style of front seat, two individual seats independently adjustable, available at extra cost from September 1955.

Similarly in September 1956 the shape of the front mudguards was rearranged with the side lamps and flashing indicators in different positions. A small chrome reflector on the headlamp rim allowed the driver to know the side lights were functioning. Overdrive was made an option.

In their test of the Sixty in 1954 The Motor magazine recorded a top speed of 76.0 mph (122.3 km/h) and acceleration from 0–60 mph (97 km/h) of 26.5 seconds. A fuel consumption of 25.8 miles per imperial gallon (10.9 L/100 km; 21.5 mpg_{‑US}) was recorded. The test car cost £1162 including taxes.

The Rover 60 was replaced by the Rover 80 which used an updated version of the overhead-valve 2286 cc (138 in³) four used in the Land Rover of that time. The Rover 80 was announced on 24 October 1959.

== Rover 90 ==
Rover 90
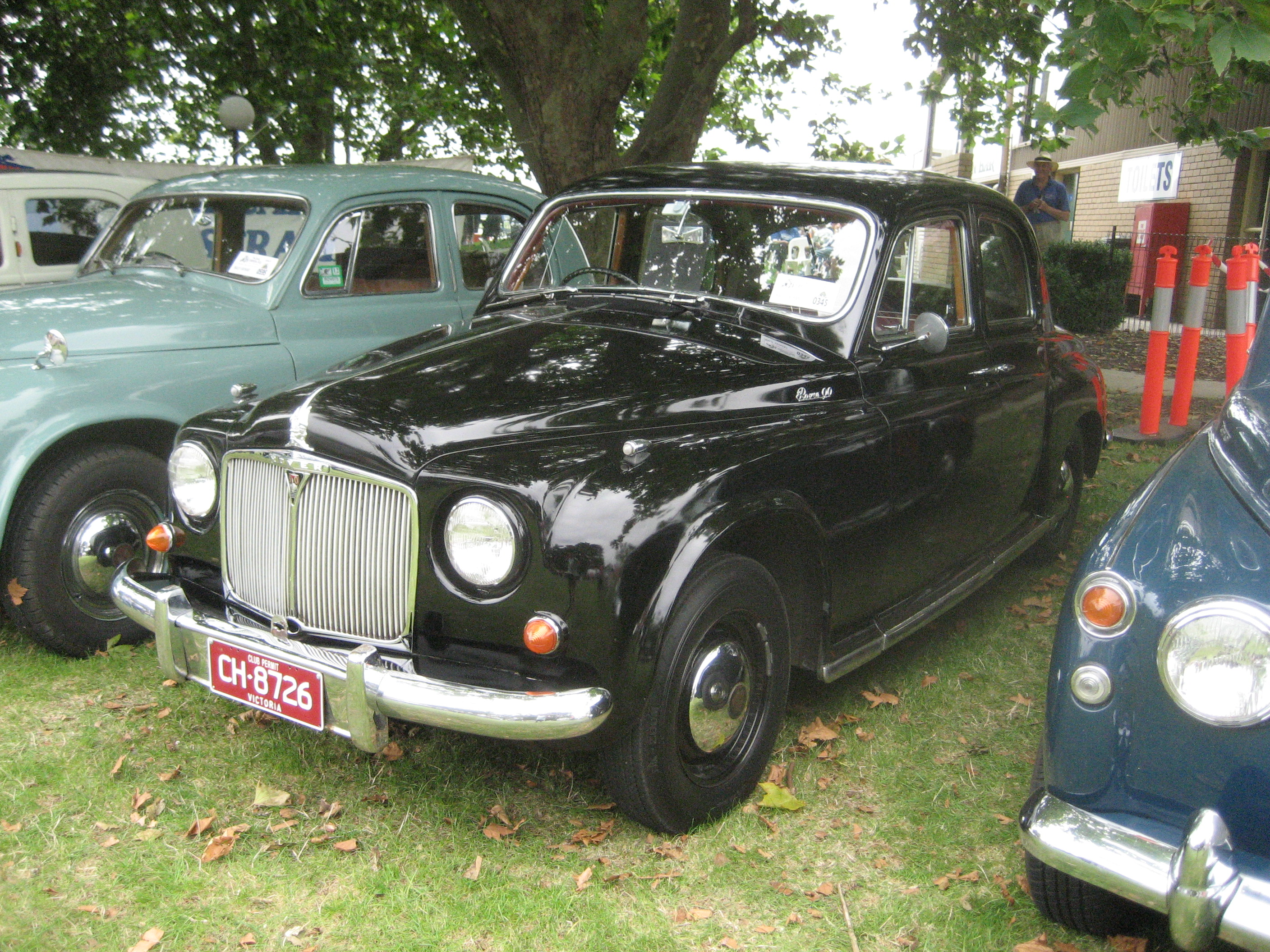
- 1955 Rover 90 from Australia

Overview
- Production: 1953–1959; 35,903 produced

Body and chassis
- Body style: 4-door saloon

Powertrain
- Engine: 2638 cc IOE I6

Chronology
- Successor: Rover 100 (see below)

The top-end Rover 90 appeared with a much larger more powerful 2.6 L (160 cu in) inline-six at the same time, 24 September 1953 as the four-cylinder Rover 60 was introduced. Rover's idiosyncratic central gear change lever designed to allow three-abreast seating in front was used for this new car. This engine produced 90 hp (67 kW) and could propel the car to reach 90 mph (145 km/h). It has a cast-iron block with an aluminium alloy head, a bore and stroke of 73.025 mm (2.9 in) by 105 mm (4.1 in) and a 6.73:1 compression ratio. This was upped to 7.5:1 in 1956.

Rover's stated intention was to cater for a wider field of motorists requiring varying degrees of performance and running costs.

The Rover 90 shared with the Rover 60 and Rover 75 the October 1954 modifications: a bigger boot, wide rear window and flashing directions indicators all announced at the Paris Motor Show.

The 1956 model was launched in September 1955. Independently adjustable separate front seats were made available at extra cost and at the same time the engine's compression ratio was increased from 6.73:1 to 7.5:1, lifting power by 3 horsepower to 93. Free-wheel was dropped and Laycock de Normanville electric overdrive made available. More sensitive power brakes were provided of a redesigned pattern. The recesses in the 'B' pillars that previously housed the trafficators in pre-1955 models were deleted in this update. Pleats were added to the seats, this treatment continued on subsequent P4 models.

In September 1956 the shape of the front mudguards was rearranged with the side lamps and flashing indicators in different positions. A small chrome reflector on the headlamp rim allowed the driver to know the side lights were functioning.

Testing the Ninety in 1954 The Motor magazine recorded a top speed of 90.0 mph (144.8 km/h) and acceleration from 0–60 mph (97 km/h) of 18.9 seconds. A fuel consumption of 20.3 miles per imperial gallon (13.9 L/100 km; 16.9 mpg_{‑US}) was recorded. The test car cost £1297 including taxes.

A road test of a Ninety published in MotorSport magazine in September 1956 described the engine as virtually inaudible when idling but the steering was "spongy and heavy" and "the roll when cornering was considerable" nevertheless, reported MotorSport, firm suspension caused "very appreciable column shake and body judder".

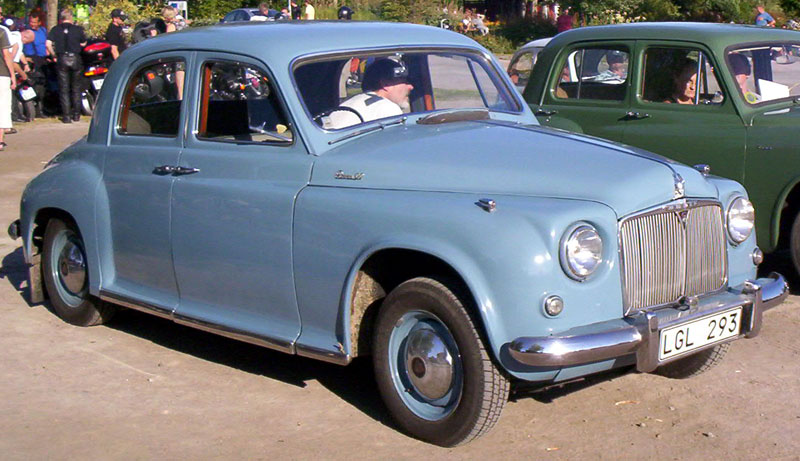
early car with trafficators and reflectors

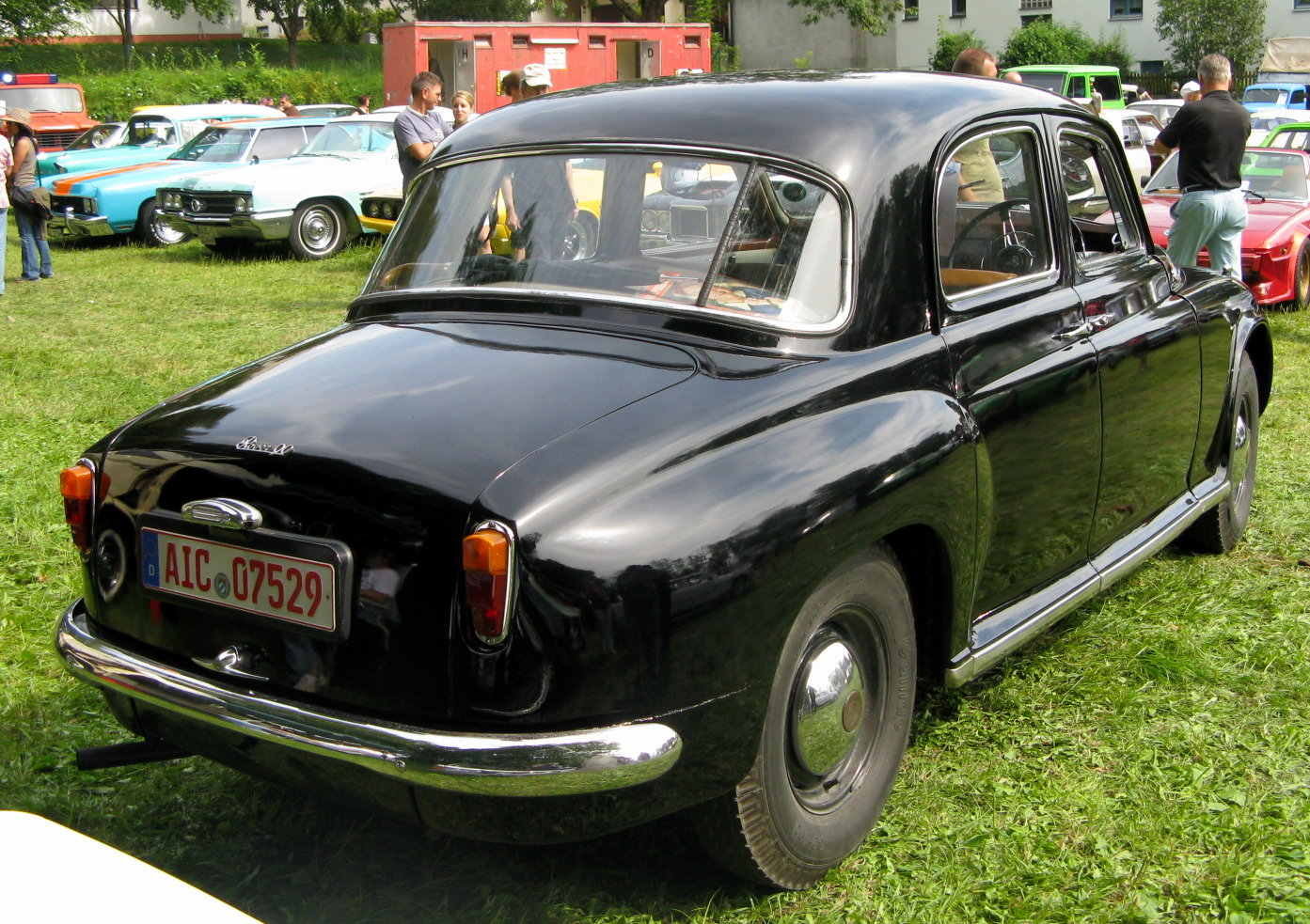
big boot and flashing direction indicators

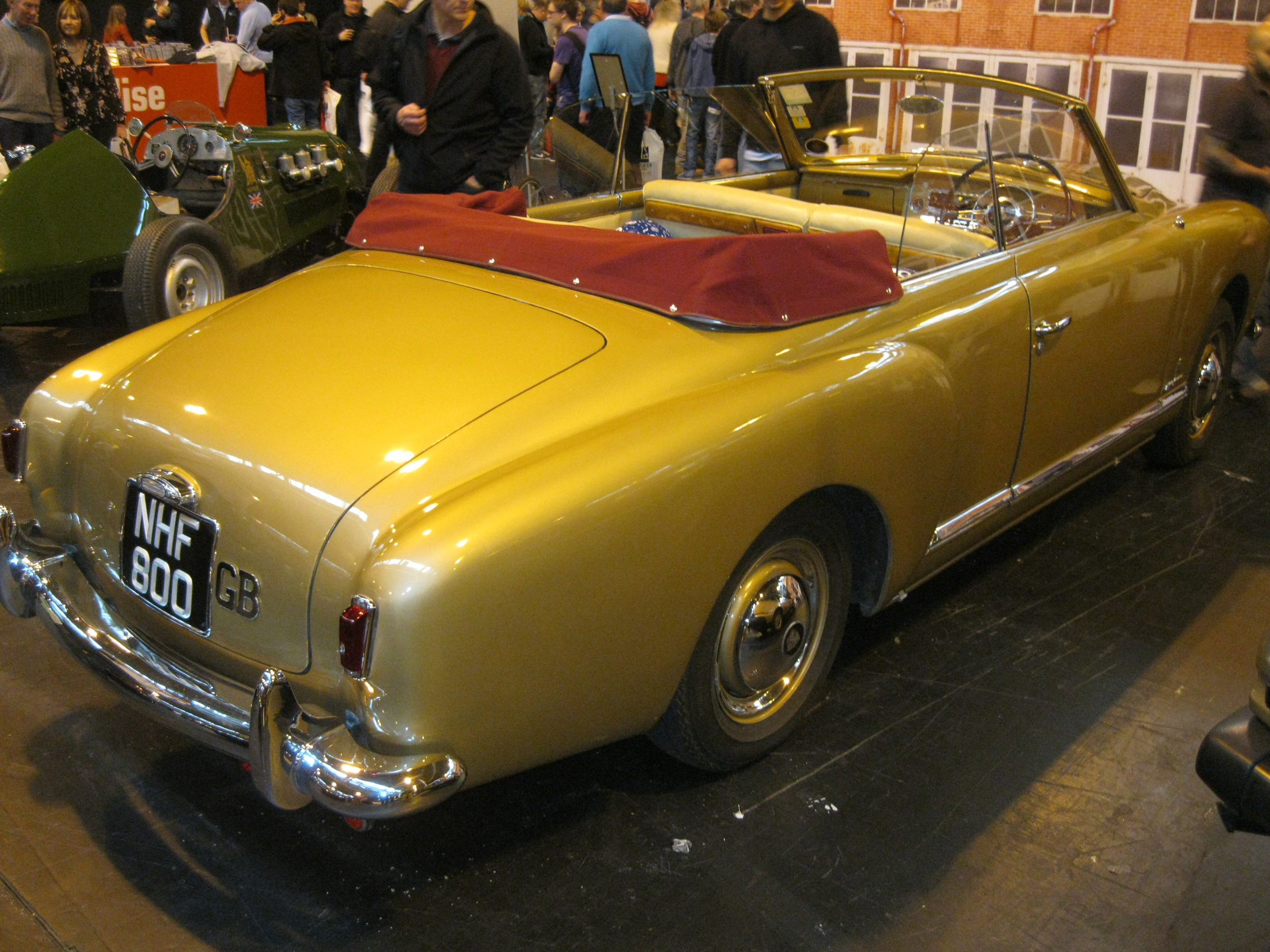
drophead coupé by Pininfarina

When it was replaced by the Rover 100 in October 1959, 35,903 had been produced, making the Rover 90 the most popular car of the P4 series.

== Rover 105R, 105S & 105 ==
Rover 105R/105S
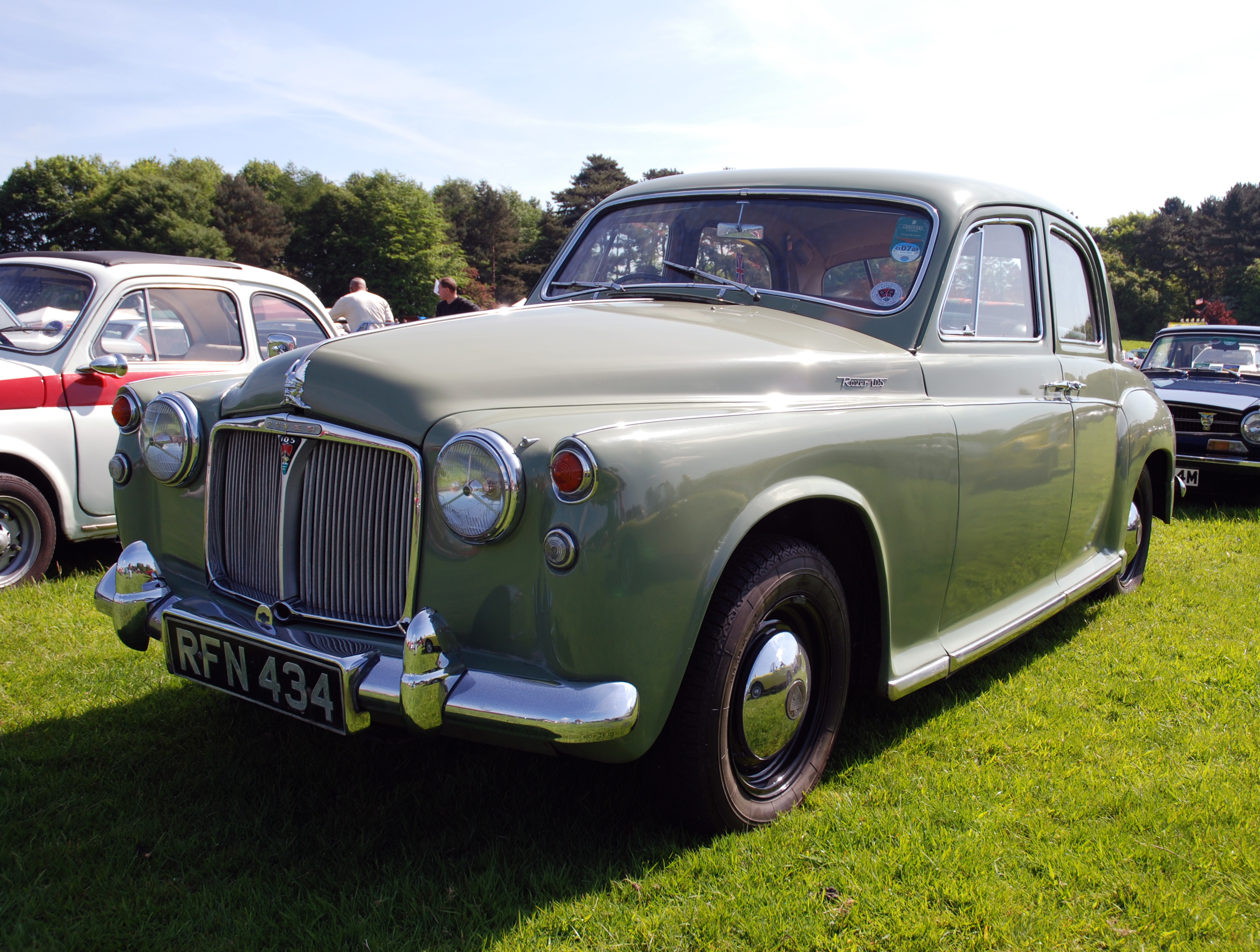
- Rover 105 registered February 1959

Overview
- Production: 1956–1959; 10,781 produced

Body and chassis
- Body style: 4-door saloon

Powertrain
- Engine: 2638 cc IOE I6

Chronology
- Predecessor: None, new upscale variant
- Successor: Rover 100 (see below)

Announced on 16 October 1956, the 105R and 105S used a high-output, 8.5:1 compression version of the 2.6 L (160 cu in) engine used in the 90. The higher compression was to take advantage of the higher octane fuel that had become widely available. This twin-SU carburettor engine produced 108 brake horsepower (81 kW). Both 105 models also featured the exterior changes of the rest of the range announced a month earlier. The 105S featured separate front seats, a cigar lighter, chromed wheel trim rings and twin Lucas SFT 576 spotlamps. To minimise the cost of the 105R, these additional items were not standard; however, they were provided on the (higher priced) 105R De Luxe.

The 105R featured a "Roverdrive" automatic transmission. This unit was designed and built by Rover and at the time was the only British-built automatic transmission. Others had bought in units from American manufacturers such as Borg-Warner. This unit was actually a two-speed automatic (Emergency Low which can be selected manually and Drive) with an overdrive unit for a total of three forward gears. The 105S made do with a manual transmission and Laycock de Normanville overdrive incorporating a kick-down control. The 105S could reach a top speed of 101 miles per hour (163 km/h).

The Motor magazine tested a 105R de luxe in 1957 and found it to have a top speed of 93.9 miles per hour (151.1 km/h) and acceleration from 0–60 miles per hour (97 km/h) of 23.1 seconds. A fuel consumption of 23.6 miles per imperial gallon (12.0 L/100 km; 19.7 mpg_{‑US}) was recorded. The test car cost £1696 including taxes of £566.

Production of the 105 line ended in 1958 for the 105R and 1959 for the manual transmission 105S, 10,781 had been produced, two-thirds with the manual transmission option. For 1959 the manual model was described simply as a 105 and the trim and accessory level was reduced to match the other models.

When the Rover 100 was announced in October 1959 it was described as the replacement for the Rover 90 and the Rover 105.

== Rover 80 ==
Rover 80
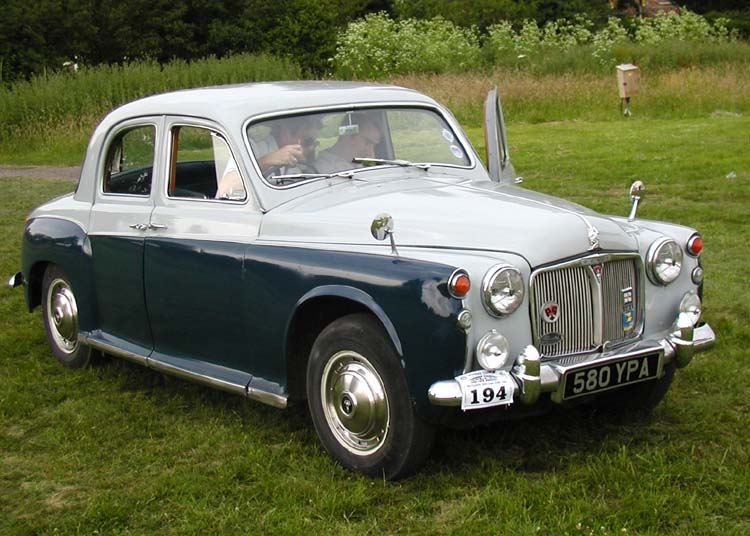
- registered May 1962

Overview
- Production: 1959–1962; 5,900 produced

Body and chassis
- Body style: 4-door saloon

Powertrain
- Engine: 2.3 litres (140 cu in) Rover I4

Chronology
- Predecessor: Rover 60
- Successor: Rover 95 (see below)

The 3-litre P5 car introduced in September 1958 was in full production and the obsolescent P4 range was reduced to just two cars, this new four-cylinder 80, announced on 24 October 1959 and the Rover 100 announced at the same time. The 80 engine was a new Land Rover-derived straight-four overhead-valve engine displacing 2.3 litres (140 cu in), entirely different from the units used in all the other models. With 80 hp (59 kW) available, the car could top 85 mph (137 km/h). Girling 10.8 inches (270 mm) vacuum servo-assisted disc brakes at the front were new, and the car used wider tyres and had updated styling. Overdrive, operating on top gear only, was standard on the four-speed transmission. Options included a radio, two tone paint schemes, and either a bench or individual front seats. These options also apply to the 100 (see below).

The four-cylinder cars were never popular, and just 5,900 had been built when, after 3 years, production ended. Its place was taken by the new Rover 95 announced in September 1962.

The Motor magazine tested an 80 in 1961 and recorded a top speed of 82.9 miles per hour (133.4 km/h) and acceleration from 0–60 miles per hour (97 km/h) of 22.4 seconds. A fuel consumption of 23.5 miles per imperial gallon (12.0 L/100 km; 19.6 mpg_{‑US}) was found. The test car cost £1396 including taxes of £411.

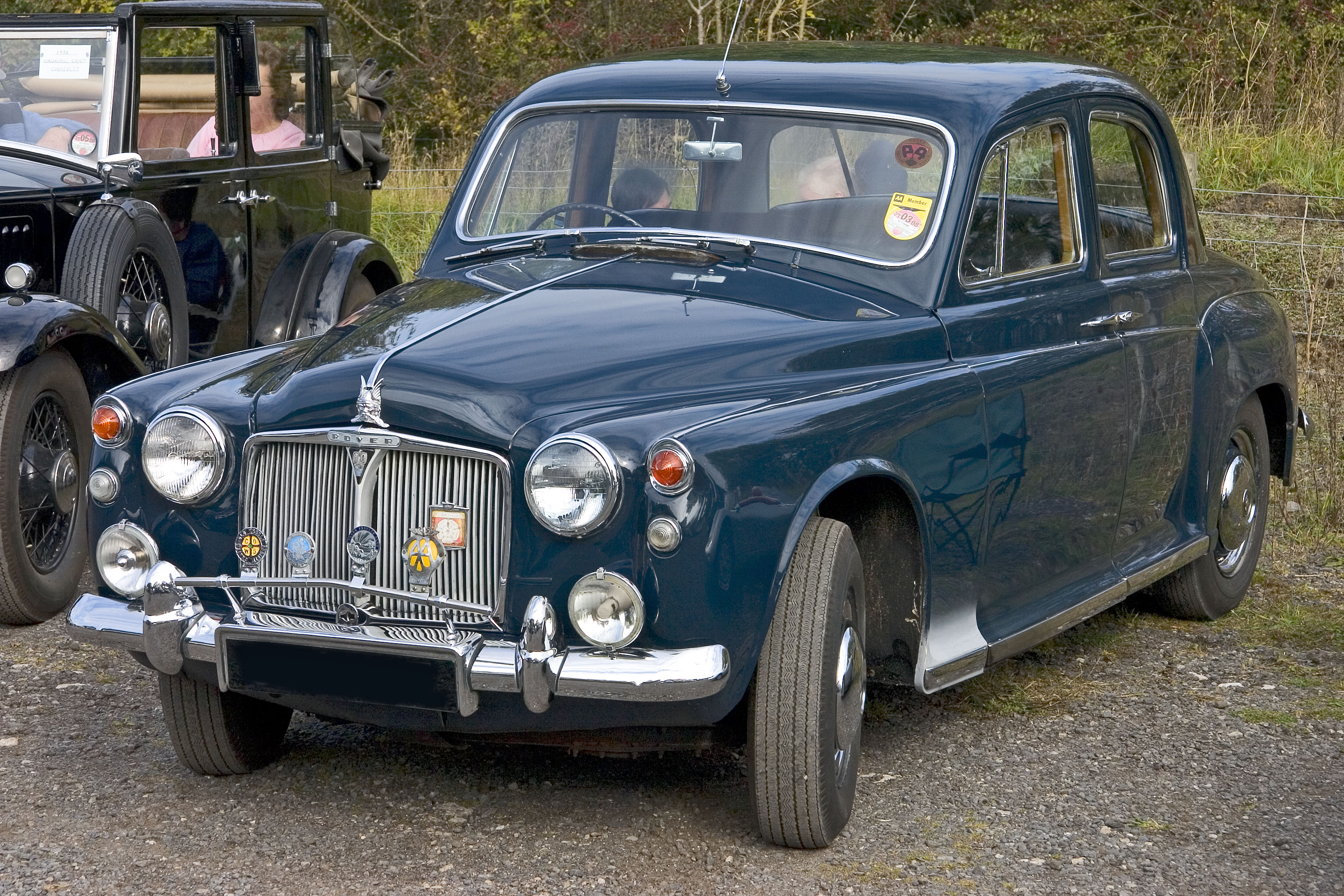
Rover 80

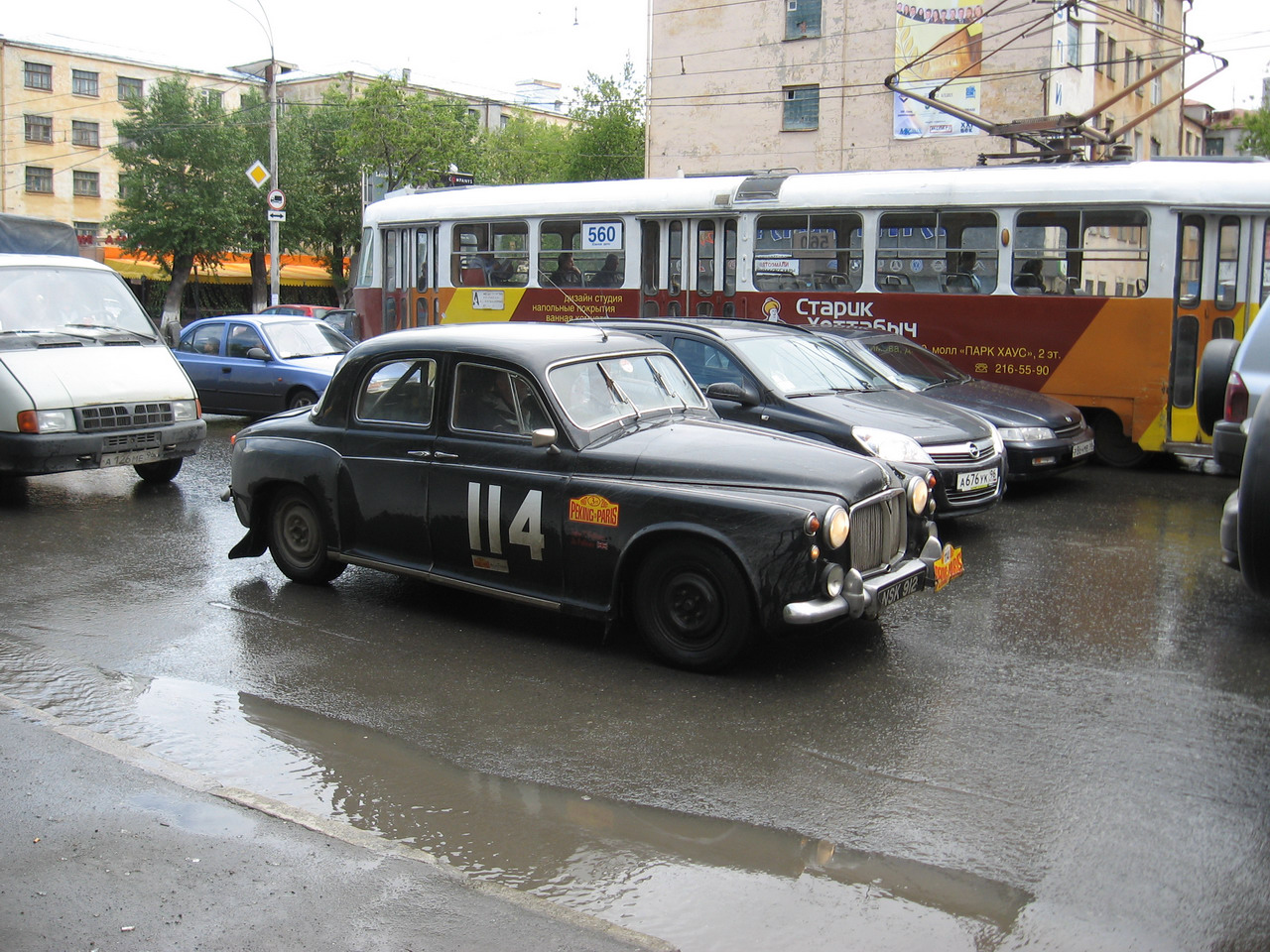
Rover 80 at the 2007 Peking to Paris race

== Rover 100 ==
Rover 100
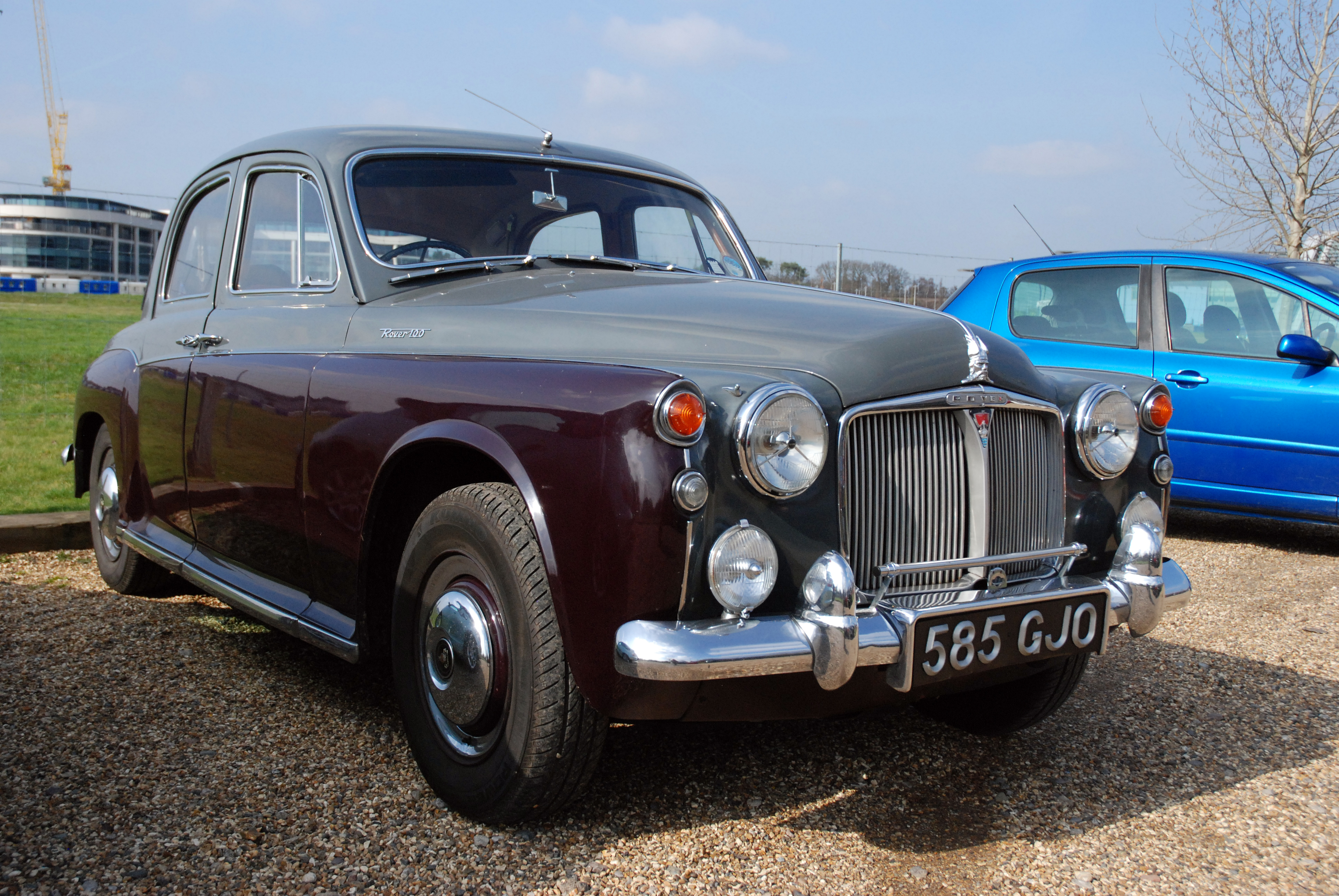
- registered November 1959

Overview
- Production: 1959–1962; 16,521 produced

Body and chassis
- Body style: 4-door saloon

Powertrain
- Engine: 2625 cc IOE I6

Chronology
- Predecessor: Rover 90; Rover 105
- Successor: Rover 110 (see below)

The Rover 90 and Rover 105 were replaced by the more powerful 100 announced on 21 October 1959. Its new seven-bearing but similar 2.6-litre (160 cu in) IOE straight-6 engine was a short-stroke version of the P5 3-litre unit. The 100 could reach 100 mph (161 km/h).

The interior was described as luxurious, with wood and leather accents on traditional English car elements. A bench front seat or individual front seats could be ordered. A heater was a standard fitting. Overdrive, on top gear only, was a standard fitting. Like the smaller 80 version, the 100 was fitted with servo-assisted Girling disc brakes at the front, keeping drum brakes at the rear.

Production ended in 1962, by which time 16,521 had been produced.

Testing the 100 in 1960, The Motor magazine recorded a top speed of 92.1 miles per hour (148.2 km/h), acceleration from 0 to 60 miles per hour (97 km/h) of 17.6 seconds and a fuel consumption of 23.9 miles per imperial gallon (11.8 L/100 km; 19.9 mpg_{‑US}). The test car cost £1538 including taxes.

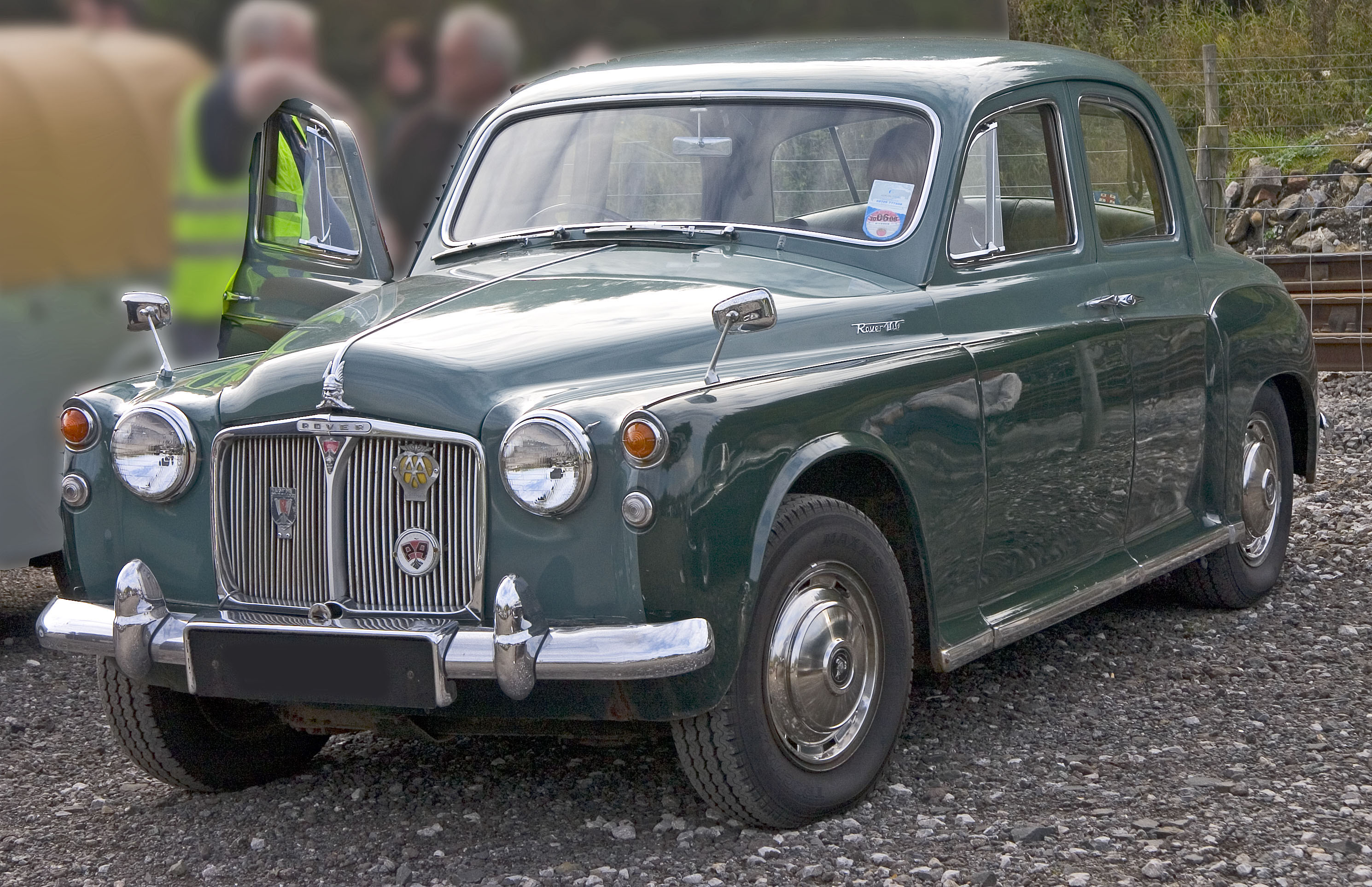

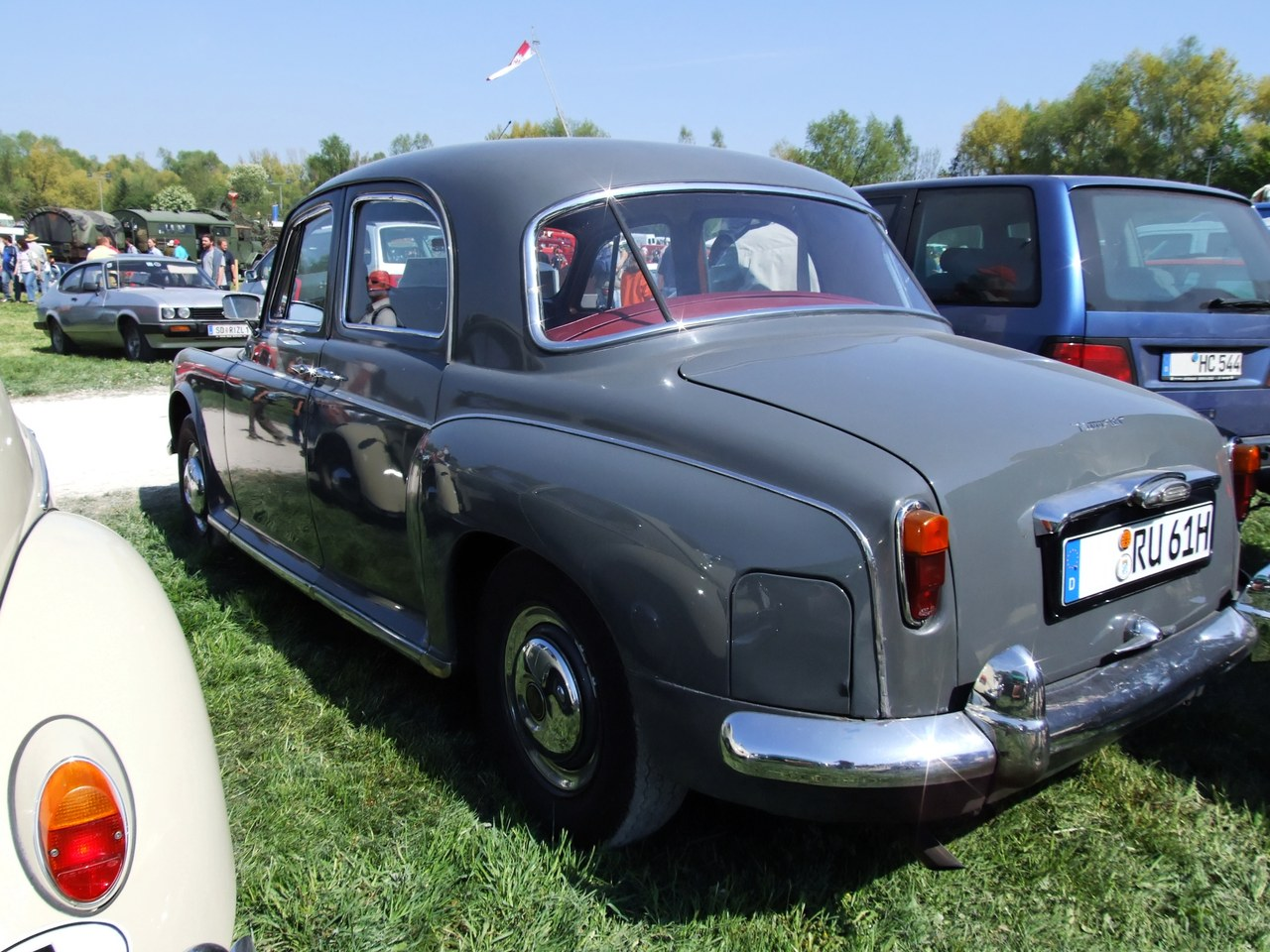

== Rover 95 and Rover 110 ==
Rover 95 Rover 110
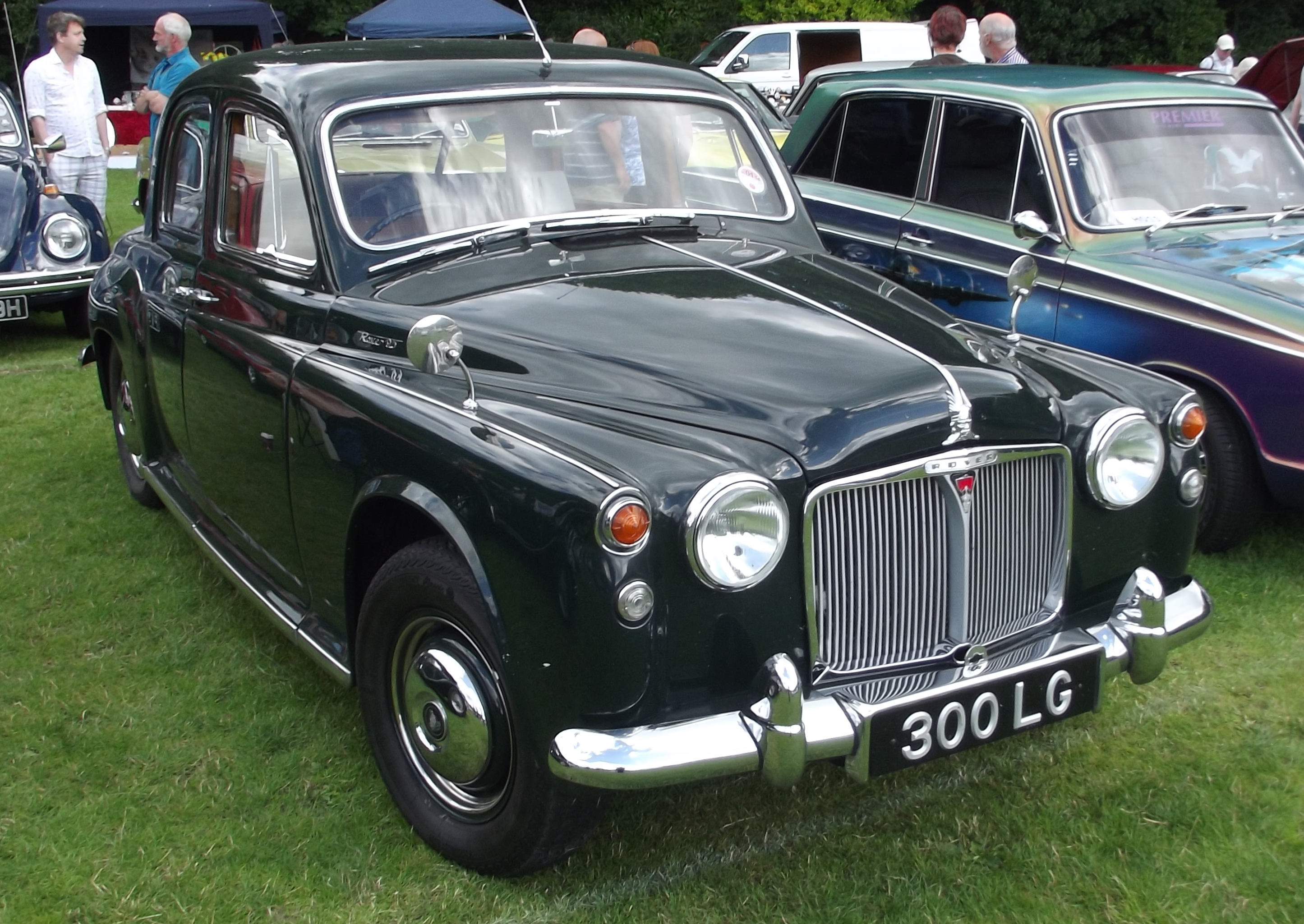
- 95 registered April 1963

Overview
- Production: 1962–1964; 3,680 (95) & 4,620 (110) produced

Body and chassis
- Body style: 4-door saloon

Powertrain
- Engine: 2625 cc IOE I6

Chronology
- Predecessor: Rover 80; Rover 100
- Successor: Rover 2000

The final members of the series were the 95 and 110. The Rover 95 was a Rover 100 regeared for economy and offered at the price level of the four-cylinder Rover 80 it replaced. The Rover 110 was a Rover 100 with a more powerful engine. Announced on 27 September 1962, these cars represented the end of an era. They were fitted with not alloy but steel door panels to reduce cost. Their very full equipment included electric windscreen washers. Although the Roverdrive automatic had been put to rest, overdrive was standard on the 110. The 95 made do with a higher ratio final drive (3.9:1).

Both cars used the same 2.6 litres (160 cu in) version of the IOE engine. The wider availability of higher octane fuels permitted an increase in the compression ratio to 8.8:1, and the old unit now produced 123 hp (91 kW) in 110 guise, which used a Weslake cylinder head, and 102 hp (76 kW) in the 95.

The Motor magazine road tested, ref 2/64, a Rover 110 on 30 January 1963. This car achieved a mean maximum of 100.0 mph, 0-60 mph in 15.9 seconds and the standing quarter mile in 20.6 seconds. This was the fastest P4 model tested in the series by The Motor.

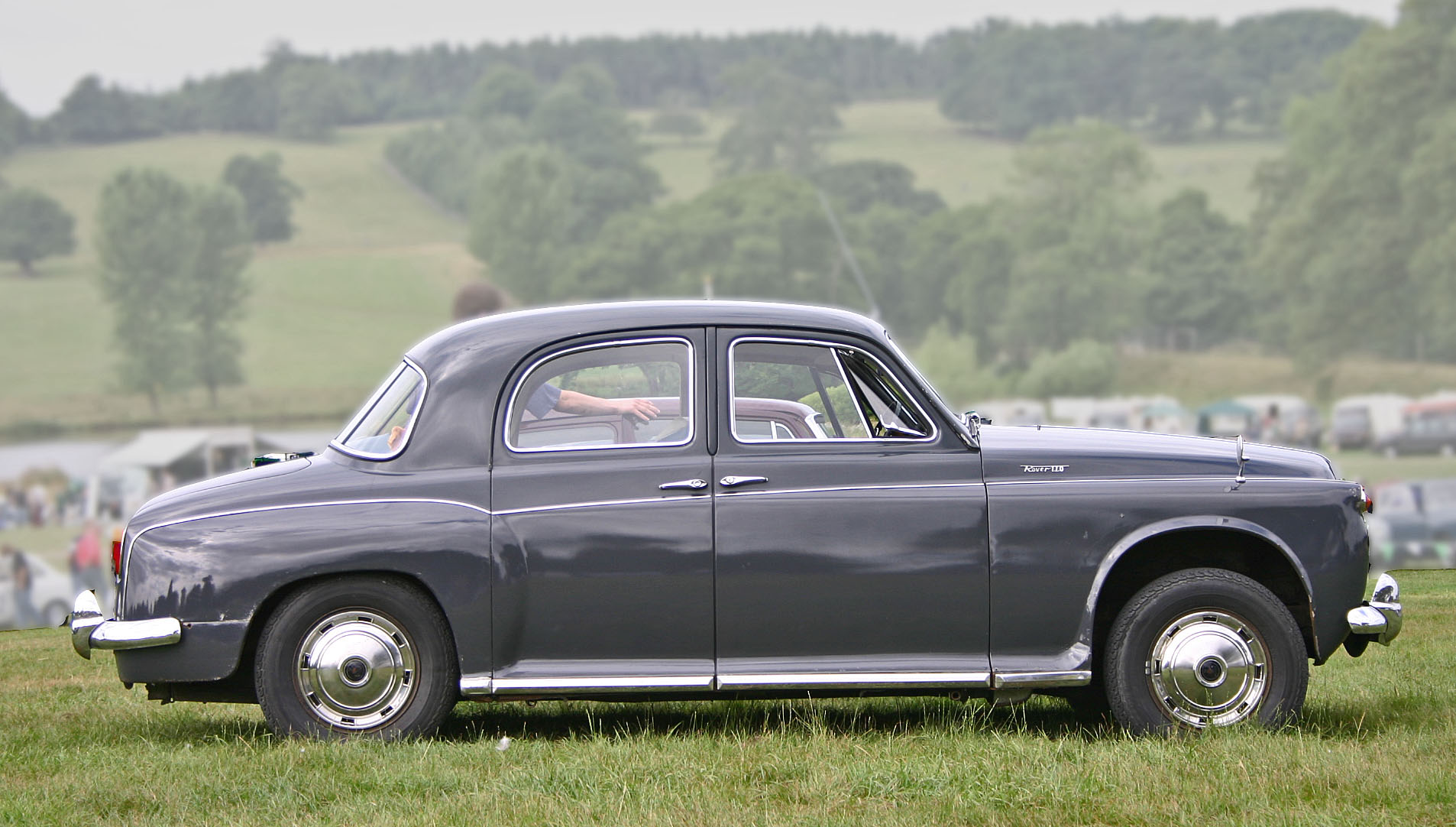
110 in profile

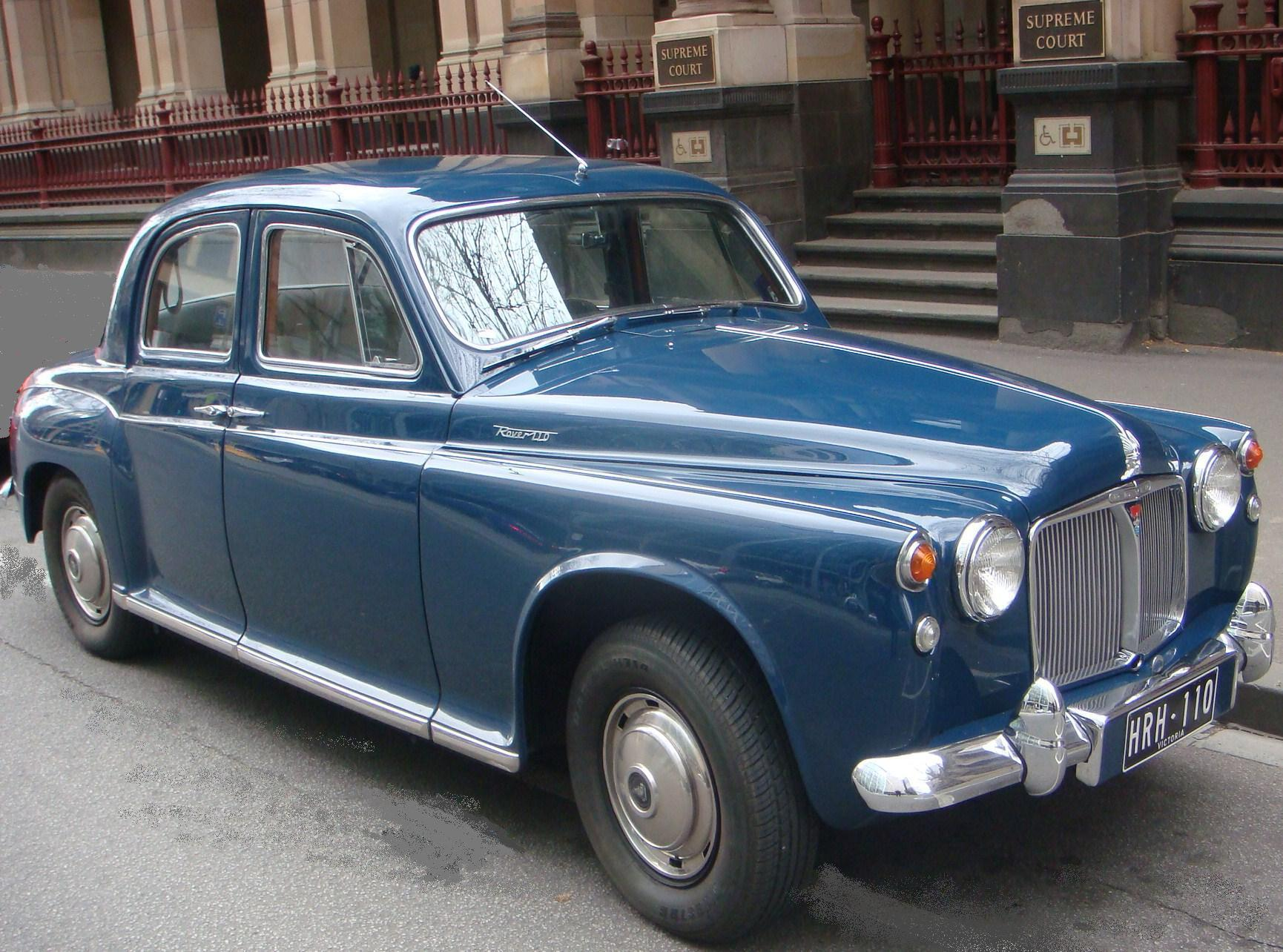
110

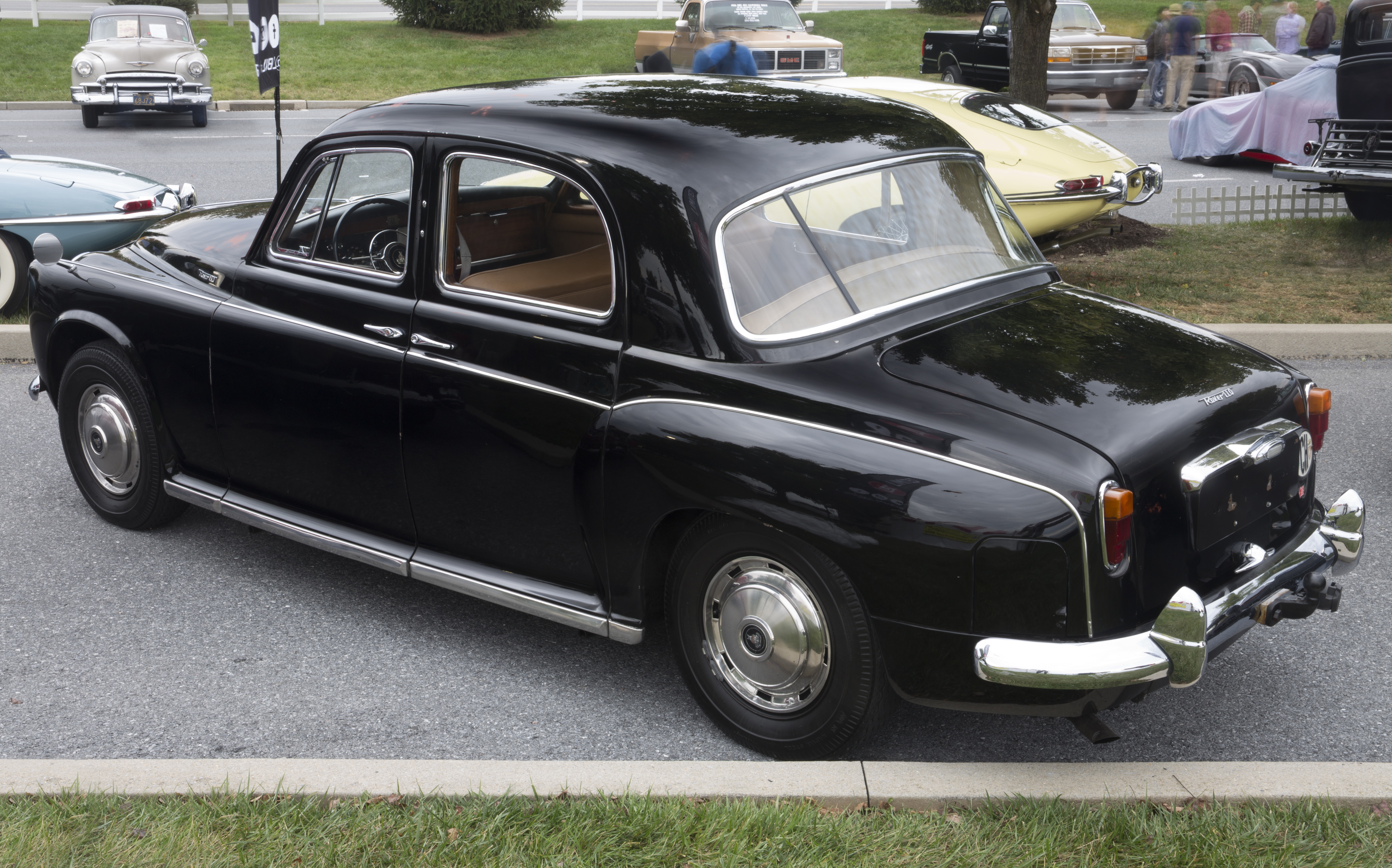
Rear view of LHD 110 (1963)

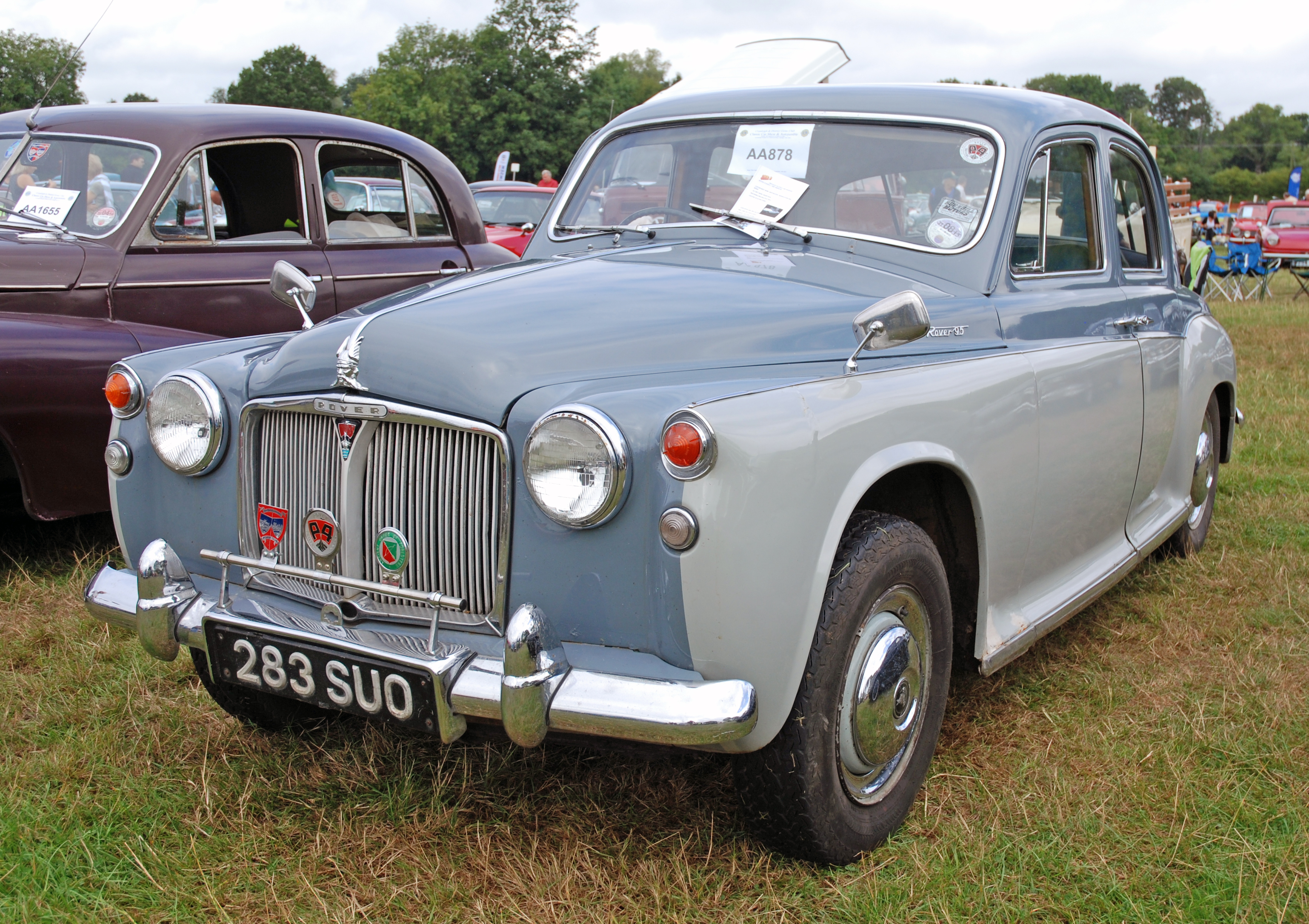
95, registered February 1964

After a successful run of some 15 years, the Rover 95 and Rover 110 were eventually replaced by Rover's wholly new Rover 2000 announced on 9 October 1963 The last P4, a 2.6 litre 95 model, rolled off the production line in May 1964 and is owned by a UK enthusiast.

== Gas turbine cars ==
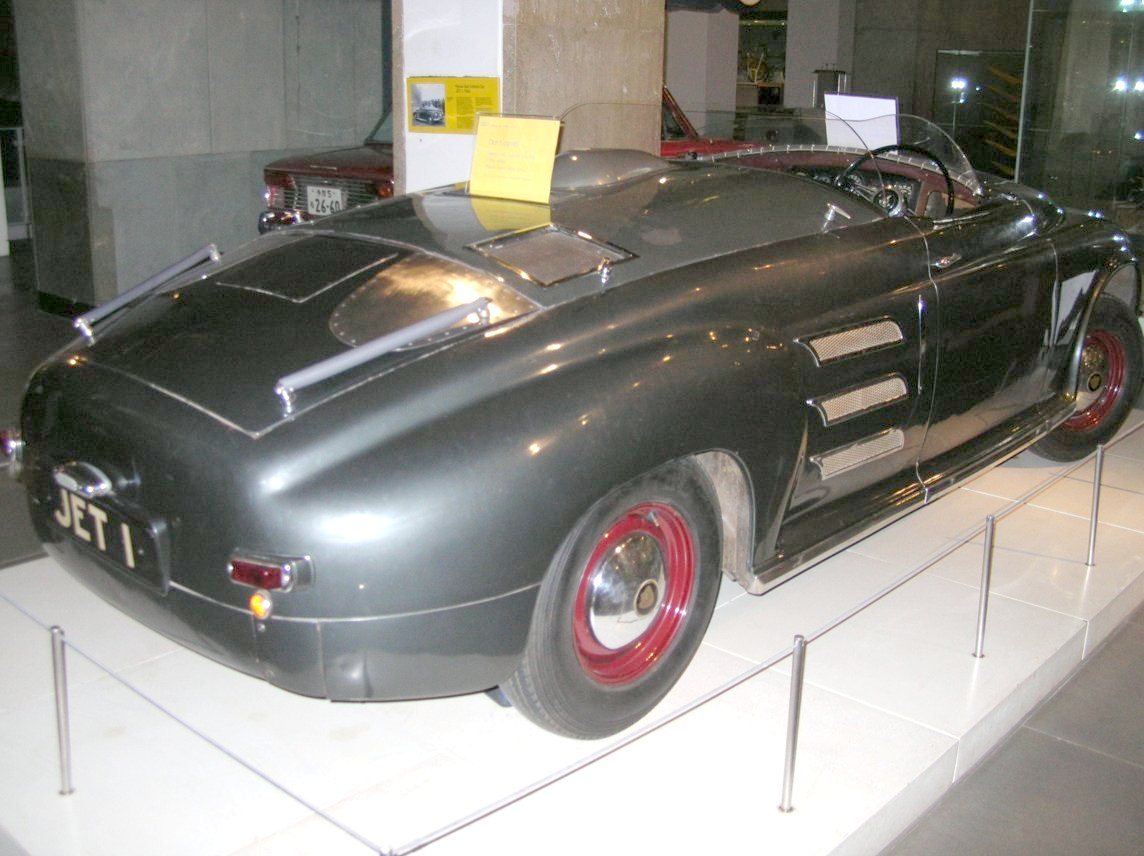
Rover JET 1 gas turbine car, on display at the Science Museum, London

The P4 platform was used in Rover's gas turbine programme, most notably as the origin of the JET 1 prototype shown to the public in the United Kingdom and United States in 1950 and subjected to speed tests on the Jabbeke highway in Belgium in 1952. JET 1, a mid-engine two-seat open tourer, was based on the P4 bodyshell. The original JET 1 is on display in the Science Museum, London.

Two further prototypes powered by gas turbine were based on the P4. The T2 had a four-door body and its gas turbine under the bonnet at the front of the car. Problems with the T2 caused Rover to abandon the front-engine concept and rebuild the car, redesignated T2A, with the turbine over the rear wheels.
