= Birmabright =

Birmabright is a trade name of the former Birmetals Co. (Birmabright works in Clapgate Lane, Quinton, Birmingham, UK) for various types of lightweight sheet metal in an aluminium–magnesium alloy. The alloy was introduced by the Birmid Group in 1929 and was particularly noted for its corrosion resistance. Birmal Boats was created in 1930 for the building of light-alloy boats. Birmetals Ltd was formed in 1936 and during the war produced both copper bearing aluminium alloys and the Birmabright magnesium bearing alloys, mainly for aircraft production.

The constituents were from 1% to 7% magnesium, with <1% manganese, and the remainder aluminium. The alloys were provided in different temper conditions. e.g. soft, 1/4 hard, 1/2 hard and were designed to be work hardened e.g. by cold pressing into shape. They do not exhibit age hardening, or have a precipitation heat treatment to promote hardening (unlike other contemporary aluminium alloys such as Duralumin). Weldability is good but machinability is only fair to poor. The alloy has good seawater corrosion resistance (unlike Duralumin).

Birmetals Ltd Birmabright grades included the following :

	Mg	Mn	Al
BB 17	0.6%		balance
BB 1	1.0%	0.5%	balance
BB 1-X	1.0%		balance
BB 2	2.0%	0.25%	balance
BB 5454	2.8%	0.7%	balance
BB 3	3.5%	0.25%	balance
BB 4	4.7%	0.7%	balance
BB 5	5.0%	0.3%	balance
BB 7	7.0%		balance

The Birmabright designations are obsolete, but equivalent grades exist, for example BB2 equivalent specifications are British standard NS4, American 5251 and ISO designation AlMg2.

Gas welding of Birmabright is easier than that of pure aluminium and may be carried out autogenously using scraps of the same material as a filler rod.

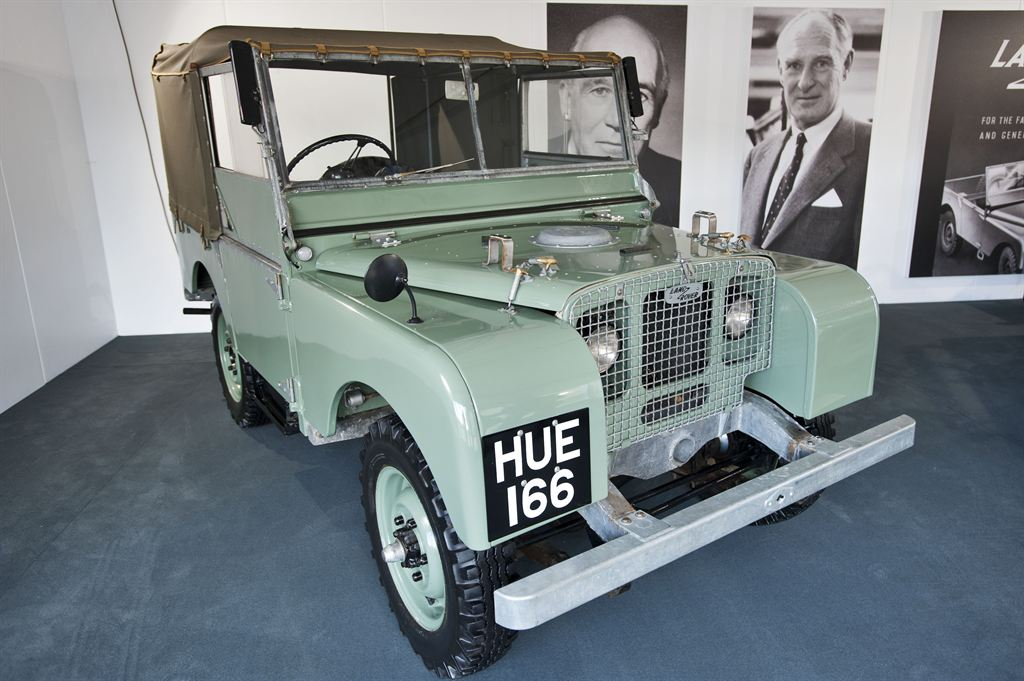
1949 model Land Rover

Birmabright is best known as the material used in the body of the Land Rover from its launch in April 1948, and in a few other classic British vehicles. The doors, boot lid and bonnet of most Rover P4 models were also Birmabright, however towards the end of production this was changed to steel to reduce costs. An early use in the 1930s was for the bodywork of the land speed record car, Thunderbolt. Also used for the bodywork of Bluebird K7 used for the Coniston speed record attempt by Donald Campbell.

The well known Laurent Giles designed 46 ft sailboat Beyond was built of riveted sheets of Birmabright and circumnavigated in the early 1950s by Tom and Ann Worth. The hull proved corrosion resistant but required re-riveting later due to crystallisation of the rivet heads, and lasted well until being sunk in the Caribbean as an artificial diving reef in the 1980s.

Birmetals (part of the Birmid Qualcast Group) closed its factory in 1980 after losing money in 1977–1979, followed by a protracted strike over wages by key staff which prevented production.

== See also ==
- Magnalium
