= Autogenous welding =

Form of welding where no additional filler material is added

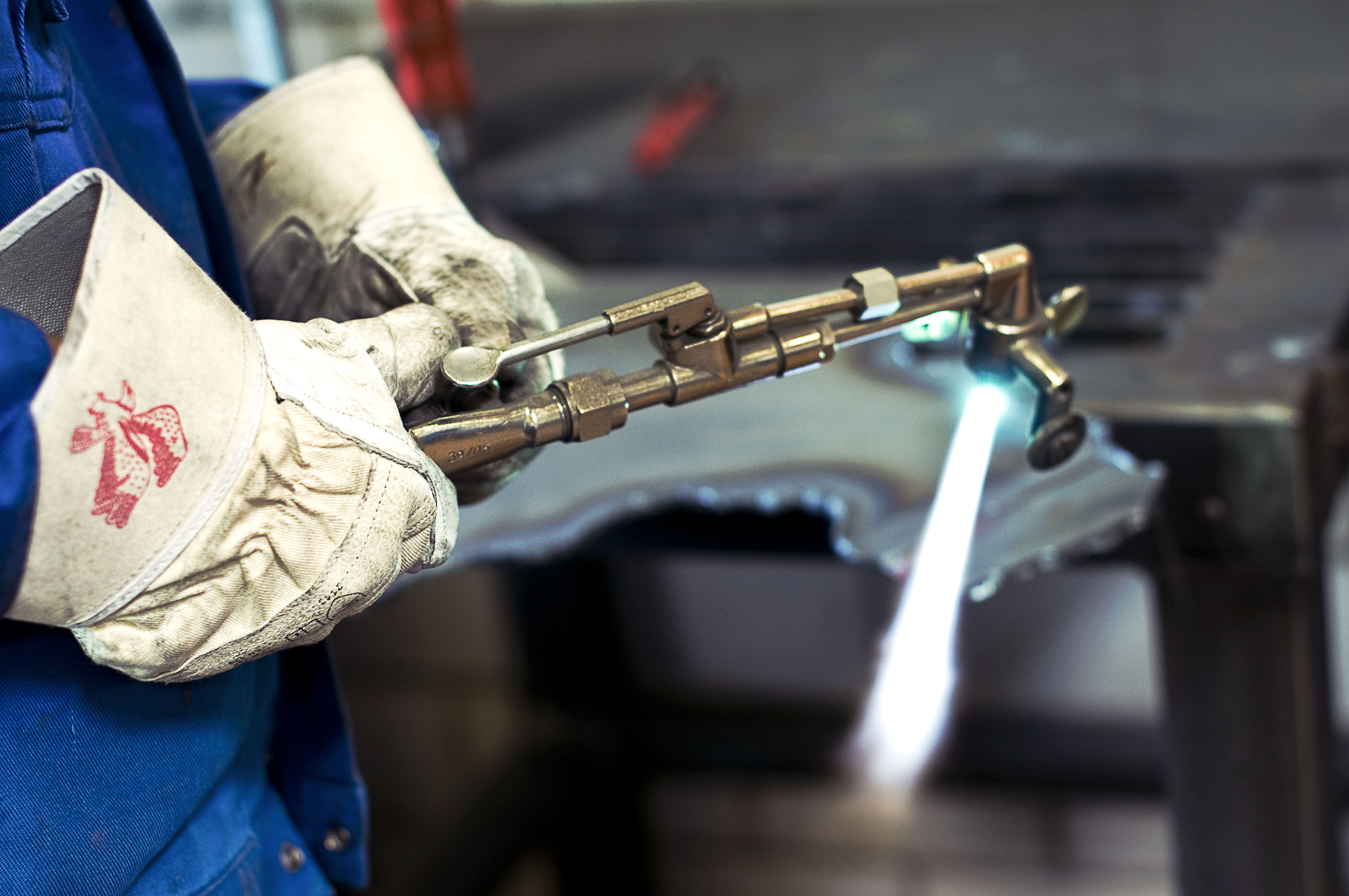

Autogenous welding is a form of welding in which the filler material is either supplied by melting the base material or is of identical composition. The weld may be formed entirely by melting parts of the base metal, and no additional filler rod is used.

There is some variation in the use of this term. Those bodies concerned with teaching the craft skill of welding tend to define it as using no filler rod, i.e. the technique is based purely on the base metal. Those concerned with the welded joint's metallurgy may make no distinction between a filler rod and the base metal, provided that the final metallurgy is identical.

Most welding processes may be either autogenous or use additional filler. Some are characteristically autogenous and avoid filler. Some arc welding processes, including such major process such as manual metal arc (stick) welding and MAGS (wire-feed) welding, cannot be used autogenously, as they rely on the consumption of a filler rod to provide the arc.

Some processes are typically autogenous. These include some gas welding processes such as lead burning (although fillers may optionally be used) and oxy-acetylene welding in some positions, such as seam welding the edges of two overlapping sheets. Resistance welding, both spot welding and seam welding, is inherently autogenous, as there is no convenient way to apply a filler. Friction and laser welding have similar restrictions.

Some alloys are prone to changing their composition when heated, particularly a loss of zinc from brass by its evaporation as vapour. In these cases, an excess of 2–3% extra zinc may be provided in the filler rod to compensate. Silicon may also be used as an additive to reduce this loss.

A few materials, such as the HY-80 series of high-strength steels, require a non-autogenous process to control their metallurgy. However, advanced processes, such as hybrid laser arc welding, have been used to achieve the same effect autogenously.
