= Amorphous brazing foil =

Types of alloy used for brazing

An amorphous brazing foil (ABF) is a form of eutectic amorphous metal that serves as a filler metal in brazing operations. ABFs are composed of various transition metals (including nickel, iron, and copper) blended with metalloids like silicon, boron, and phosphorus. By precisely managing the concentration of these metalloids to achieve or approach the eutectic point, these alloys can undergo rapid solidification to form a ductile, amorphous foil. This process allows the ABF to effectively bond materials in the brazing process, providing a strong and seamless joint.

== Production ==
The production of an amorphous metal can be achieved by cooling the liquid alloy too rapidly to allow a crystal structure to form. Melt spinning, a traditional method, produces a 0.5–125 mm wide strip with a thickness of 20–50 μm. Cutting, stamping, etching, or other methods can transform the cooled metal into parts or preforms.

== Properties ==
A key characteristic of ABFs is their relatively low melting points, which typically range from 830 to 1200 °C. This attribute is crucial for their application as filler metals in brazing. Due to their ductility and flexibility, ABFs present a viable alternative to filler metals in paste or powder form. This substitution offers notable advantages, such as the elimination of soot formation, a common drawback associated with residual organic solvents in paste-based fillers. Additionally, ABFs help minimize the formation of surface oxides, an issue frequently encountered with gas-atomized powder fillers, thereby enhancing the quality and integrity of the brazed joint.

== Usage ==
Amorphous brazing foils are used for brazing, a metallurgical process by which two pieces of metal are joined by melting and cooling a third "filler metal" between them. The use of preforms increases the capability of ABFs for use on an industrial scale, aiding machine assembly.
