= Symbols and conventions used in welding documentation =

The symbolic representation of a V weld of chamfered plates in a technical drawing

The symbols and conventions used in welding documentation are specified in national and international standards such as ISO 2553 Welded, brazed and soldered joints -- Symbolic representation on drawings and ISO 4063 Welding and allied processes -- Nomenclature of processes and reference numbers. The US standard symbols are outlined by the American National Standards Institute and the American Welding Society and are noted as "ANSI/AWS". Due in part to the growth of the oil industry, this symbol set was used during the 1990s in about 50% of the world's welding operations. An ISO committee sought to establish a global standard during this decade.

In engineering drawings, each weld is conventionally identified by an arrow which points to the joint to be welded. The arrow is annotated with letters, numbers and symbols which indicate the exact specification of the weld. In complex applications, such as those involving alloys other than mild steel, more information may be called for than can comfortably be indicated using the symbols alone. Annotations are used in these cases.

== Component elements ==
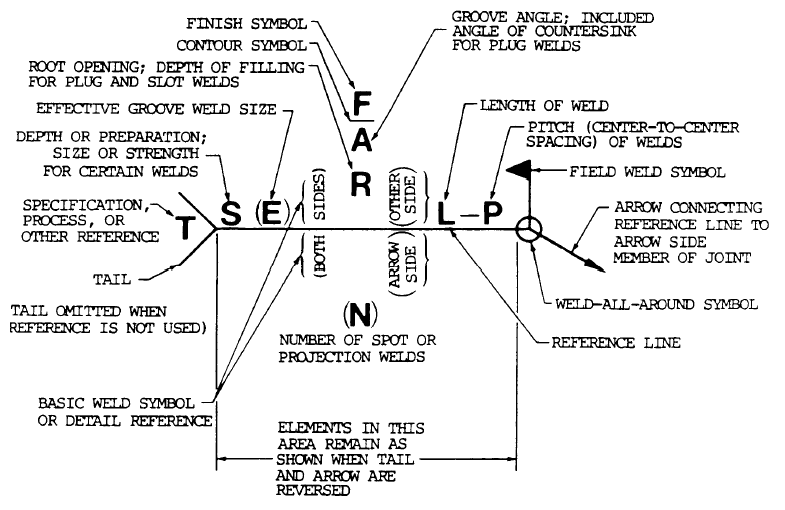
The location of the elements of a welding symbol when following US conventions.

In the US, the component elements of the weld specification are:

1. The reference line - the body of the arrow which is the baseline for the specification.
2. The arrow tip which goes at an angle to the reference line, pointing to the joint to be welded.
3. The tail which goes at the other end of the reference line.
4. The basic welding symbol which goes on the reference line to indicate the shape of the weld such as a fillet or plug. The symbol is placed on the arrow side or other side of the line to indicate which side of the joint the weld goes.
5. The dimensions and other numbers such as the length of the weld or number of spot welds go above and below the reference line.
6. Supplementary symbols go at the junction of the reference line and the arrow tip. One such symbol is a circle to indicate an all-around weld, which goes on every side of the joint.
7. Finish symbols go above the reference line to indicate the surface contour or finish of the weld such as flush, convex or concave.
8. Letters indicating the welding process are placed at the tail end, such as AHW for atomic hydrogen welding. Further examples include:

== Abbreviations for welding processes ==
If a particular welding process needs to be indicated in addition to the symbols, the following abbreviations are commonly used in North America:

| Designation | Welding process |
|---|---|
| CAW | Carbon-arc welding |
| DB | Dip brazing |
| FB | Furnace brazing |
| FW | Flash welding |
| GMAW | Gas metal-arc welding |
| GTAW | Gas tungsten-arc welding |
| IB | Induction brazing |
| OAW | Oxy-acetylene welding |
| OHW | Oxy-hydrogen welding |
| PGW | Pressure gas welding |
| RB | Resistance brazing |
| SAW | Submerged arc welding |
| SMAW | Shielded metal arc welding |
| TB | Torch brazing |
| UW | Upset welding |
