= OAW =

OAW may stand for:

- Helvetic Airways, a Swiss airline, ICAO code OAW
- Ostdeutsche Albatroswerke G.m.b.H, a subsidiary of Albatros Flugzeugwerke, World War I German aircraft manufacturer
- Austrian Academy of Sciences (Österreichische Akademie der Wissenschaften) (ÖAW)
- openArchitectureWare, a modular MDA/MDD generator framework implemented in Java
- Convention used in welding documentation for Oxy-acetylene welding
