= Pendant =

Piece of jewellery made to hang from a cord, chain, ribbon or necklace

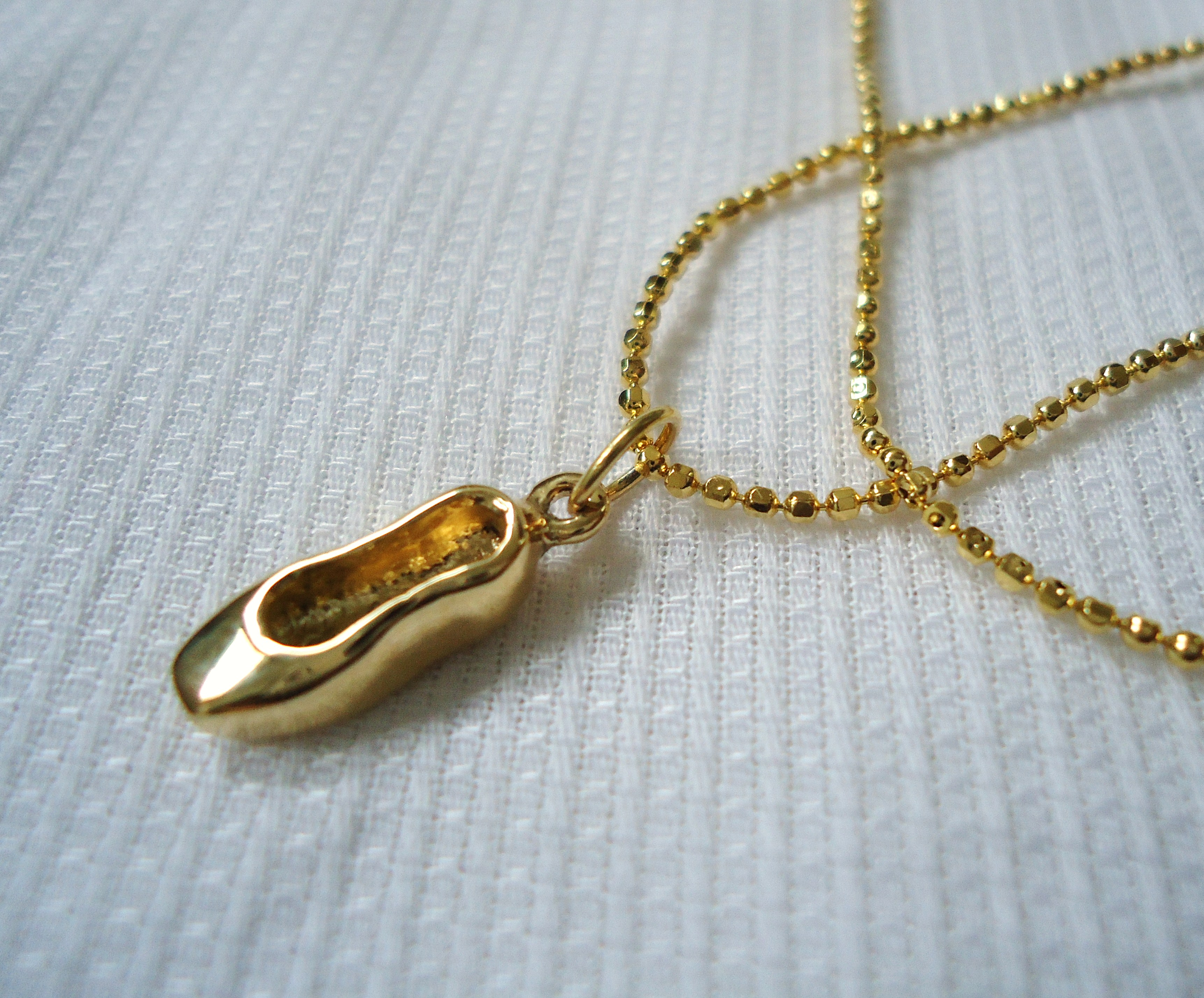
A gold pendant in the shape of a pointe shoe

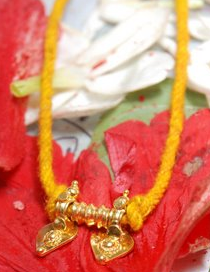
Pushpaka Thali - Wedding pendant used by Pushpaka Brahmins of Kerala, India

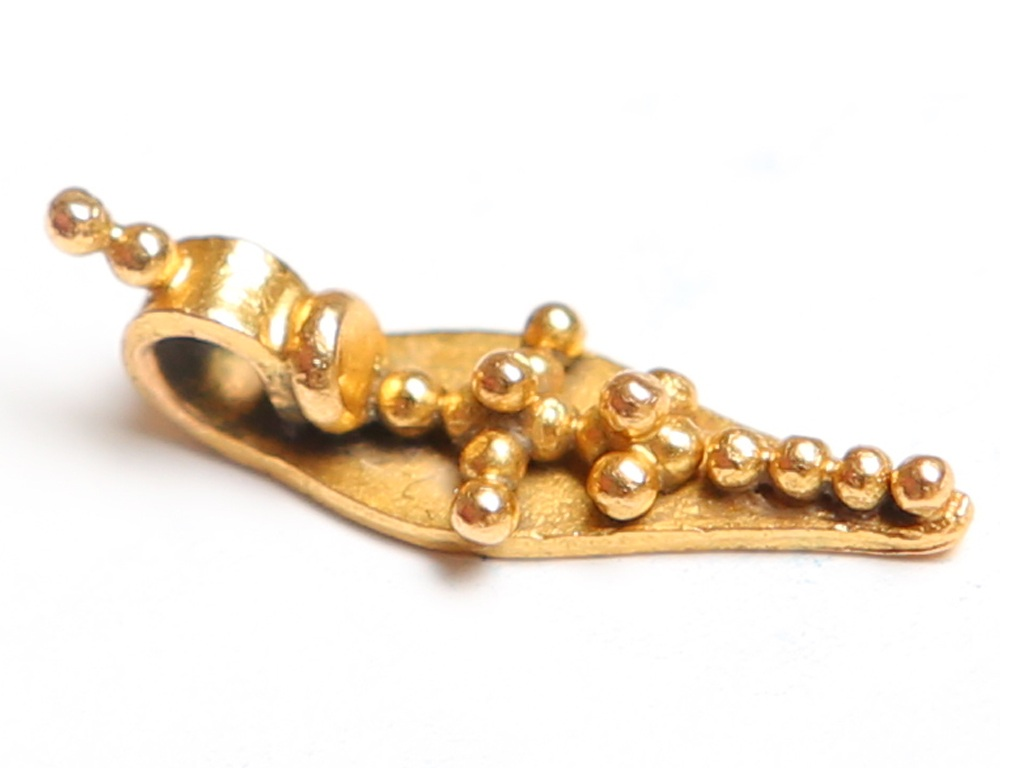
Wedding pendant with 21 beads used by Saint Thomas Christians of India

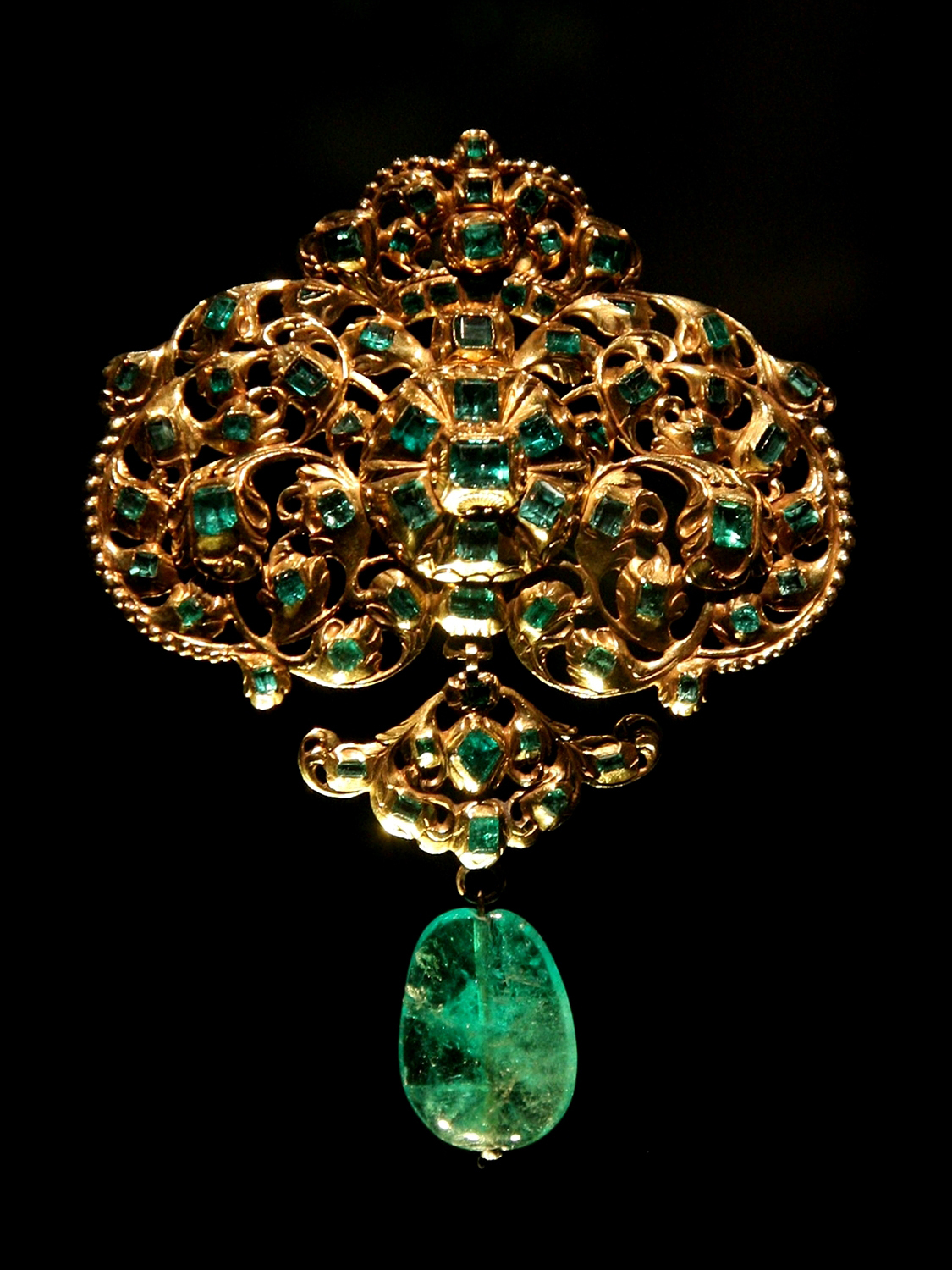
Spanish pendant at Victoria and Albert Museum.

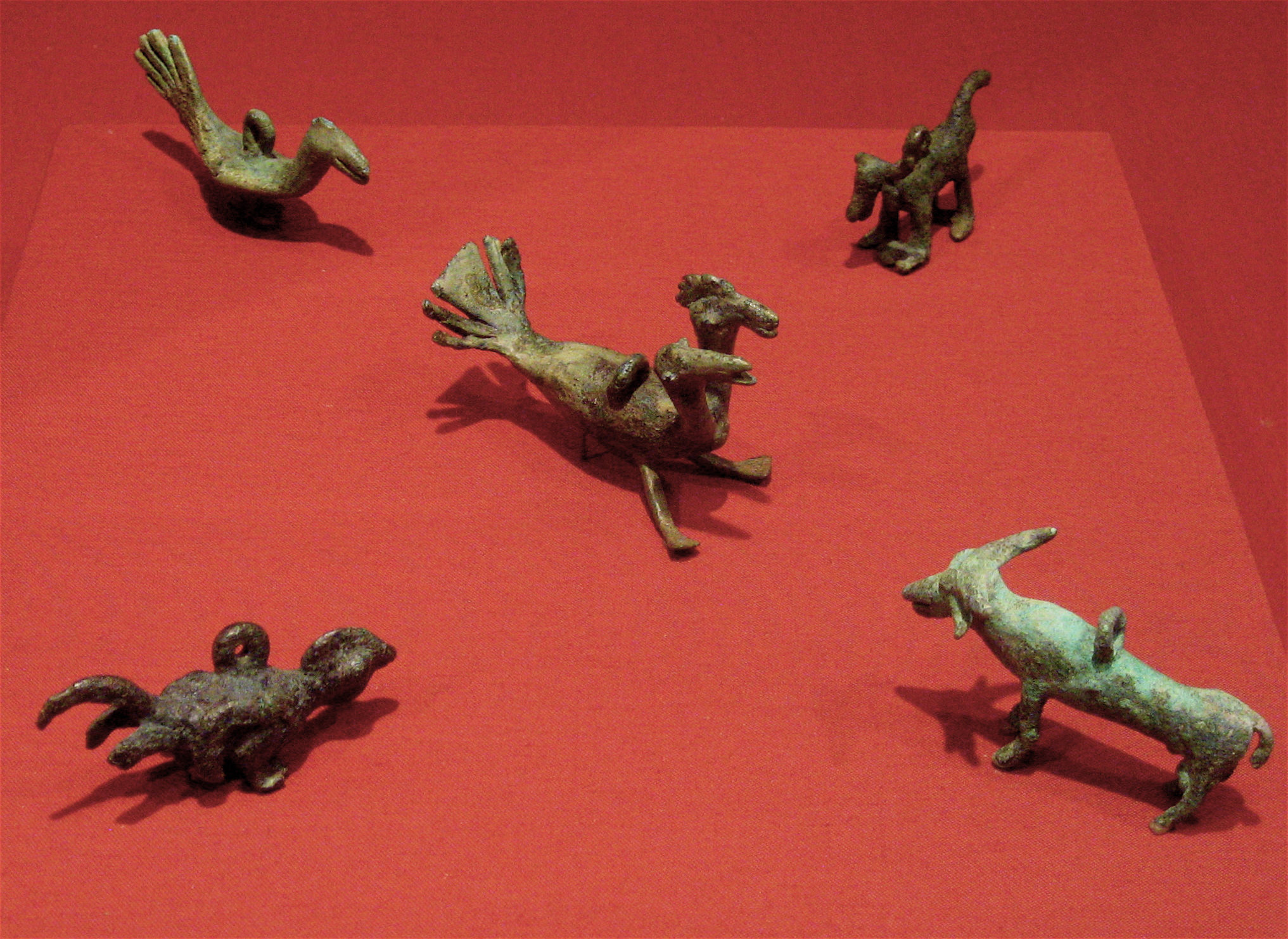
Indonesian pendants

A pendant is a loose-hanging piece of jewellery, generally attached by a small loop to a necklace, which may be known as a "pendant necklace". A pendant earring is an earring with a piece hanging down. Its name stems from the Latin word pendere and Old French word pendr, both of which translate to "to hang down". In modern French, pendant is the gerund form of pendre ("to hang") and also means "during". The extent to which the design of a pendant can be incorporated into an overall necklace makes it not always accurate to treat them as separate items.

In some cases, though, the separation between necklace and pendant is far clearer.

== Overview ==
Carved agarwood imperial pendant, Qing dynasty, China. Adilnor Collection, Sweden.

Pendants are among the oldest recorded types of bodily adornment. Stone, shell, pottery, and more perishable materials were used. Ancient Egyptians commonly wore pendants, some shaped like hieroglyphs.

Pendants can have several functions, which may be combined:

- Award (i.e., Scouting Ireland Chief Scout's Award, Order of CúChulainn)
- Identification (i.e., religious symbols, sexual symbols, symbols of rock bands)
- Ornamentation
- Ostentation (i.e., jewels).
- Protection (i.e., amulets, religious symbols)
- Self-affirmation (i.e., initials, names)

The many specialized types of pendants include lockets which open, often to reveal an image, and pendilia, which hang from larger objects of metalwork.

== Types ==
Throughout the ages, pendants have come in a variety of forms to serve a variety of purposes.

=== Amulet ===
Though amulets come in many forms, a wearable amulet worn around the neck or on the arm or leg in the form of a pendant is the most common. These are objects believed to possess magical or spiritual power to protect the wearer from danger or dispel evil influences.

=== Talisman ===
Similar to an amulet, a talisman is an object believed to possess supernatural traits. However, while an amulet is strictly a defensive object, a talisman is meant to confer special benefits or powers upon the wearer.

=== Locket ===
A locket is a small object that opens to reveal a space which serves to hold a small object, usually a photograph or a curl of hair. They typically come in the form of a pendant hanging from a necklace, though they will occasionally be hung from a charm bracelet.

=== Medallion ===
A medallion is most often a coin-shaped piece of metal worn as a pendant around the neck or pinned onto clothing. These are generally granted as awards, recognitions, or religious blessings.

=== Painting ===
Pendant is the name given to one of two paintings conceived as a pair. They usually are gift from couples and some cultures consider the act of giving one a marry proposition.

=== Functional pendants ===
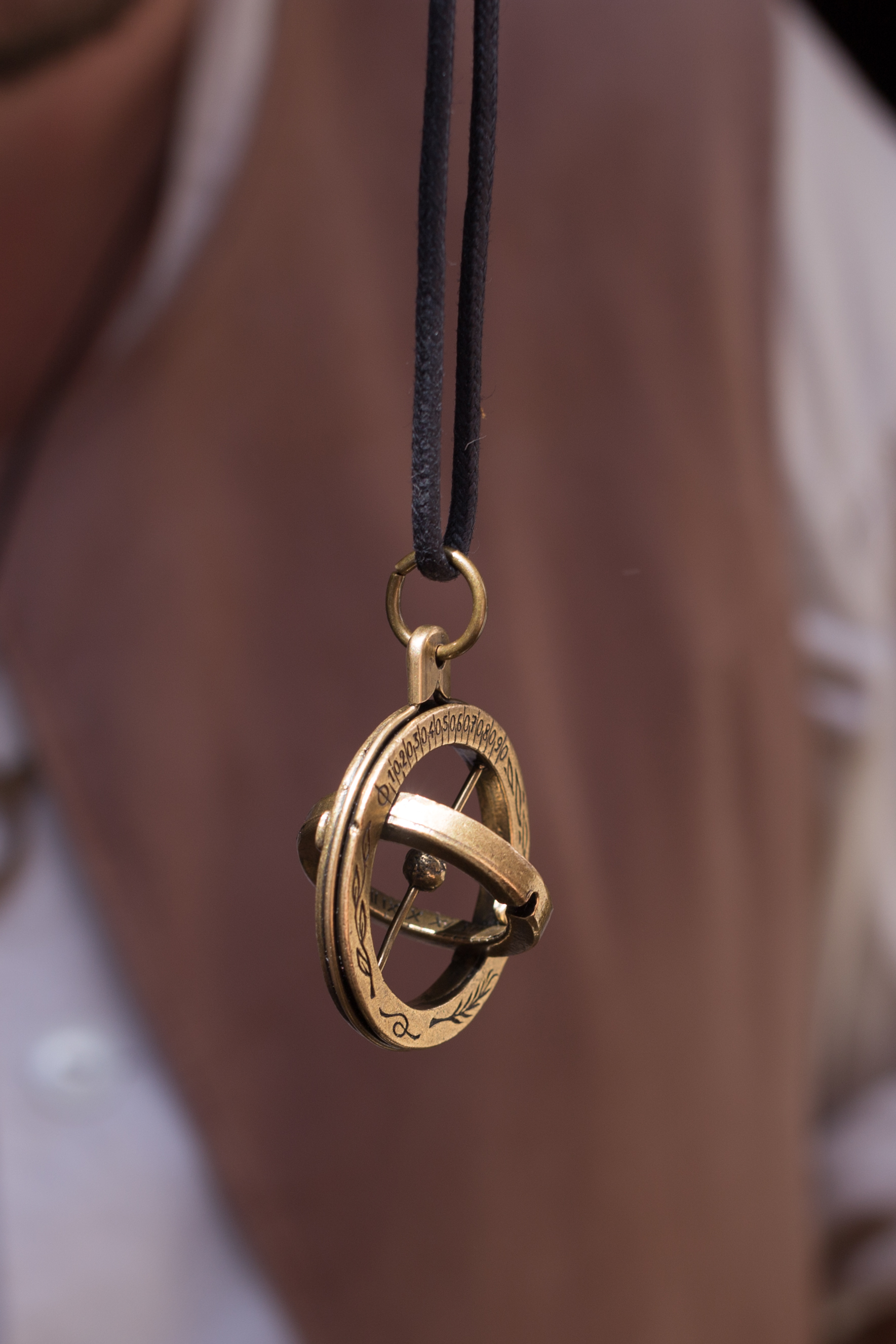
Traveller's sundial pendant (a portable form of astronomical rings) used to tell time from the sun.

Tools worn as pendants include Maori pounamu pendants. Shepherd's whistles, bosun's whistles, and ocarinas can also be made as pendants. Portable astronomical and navigational instruments were made as pendants.

In the first decade of the 21st century, jewellers started to incorporate USB flash drives into pendants.

=== Fashion pendants ===
Fashion pendants include a small creative piece often made from precious or non-precious stones and metals like diamonds or pearls hanging freely from a chain or necklace. These are generally worn as a statement piece or a fashion ornament.

=== Other types ===
- Harness pendant

== See also ==
- Boule de Genève
- Petit chien à bélière
- Tudor Heart Pendant
- Yupei - Chinese jade pendant
- Jewellery chain
