= Petit chien à bélière =

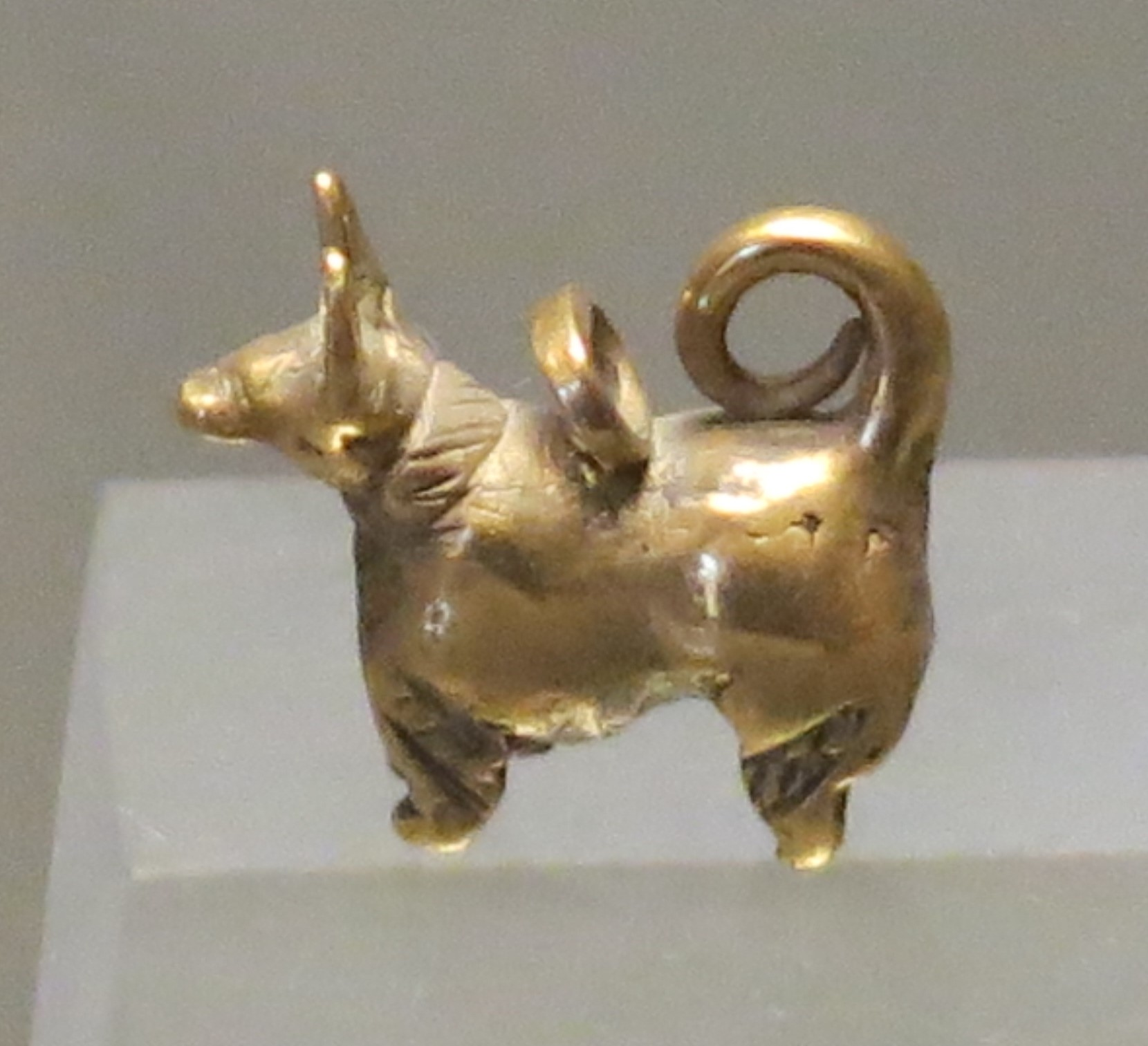
- Artist: Unknown
- Year: 3300 BCE - 3100 BCE
- Medium: Au
- Subject: Dog with ring
- Dimensions: 1.4 cm × 1.5 cm (0.046 ft × 0.049 ft)
- Location: Louvre Museum (Richelieu wing, Ground floor), room 232, inventory number Sb 5692; Paris, France

The Petit chien à bélière - small bound dog - or Pendeloque au chien de Suse - dog pendant of Susa - is a pendant in the form of a dog. The pendant was found in the tell of the Susa acropolis and dates to around 3300 BCE - 3100 BCE. The term bélière is a reference to the ring bound to the dog.

== Description ==
The pendant is a small object - only 1.5 cm long. It is one of the first examples of metalsmithing at the end of the 4th millennium BCE. It represents a synthesis of all the metallurgical techniques known in the Susa region during the era of Uruk. It provides interesting information about one of the two known dog breeds in the Susan plain.

In this era, metallurgical techniques used a process of melting ore to extract the metal, which was then poured into molds, often at temperatures greater than 800 °C.

The fabrication techniques include cire perdue casting for the large part of the body and "hot drawing" of the ears and tail, with additional material for the back of the dog.

The connection of the ring with the main body cannot be made with a simple binding, for there is a risk of melting the main body. In what is one of the first examples of the use of brazing in history, a mixture of copper and gold is used without the need for an elevated temperature.

The dog is not representative of the elegant Arab greyhounds seen on ceramic vases discovered in the cities of Suse I, but is a domesticated rustic breed adapted for herding sheep.

== History ==
The pendant was discovered with the finds of R. de Mecquenem during the excavation of the city of Susa in 1939.

There are other sculptures of this type:

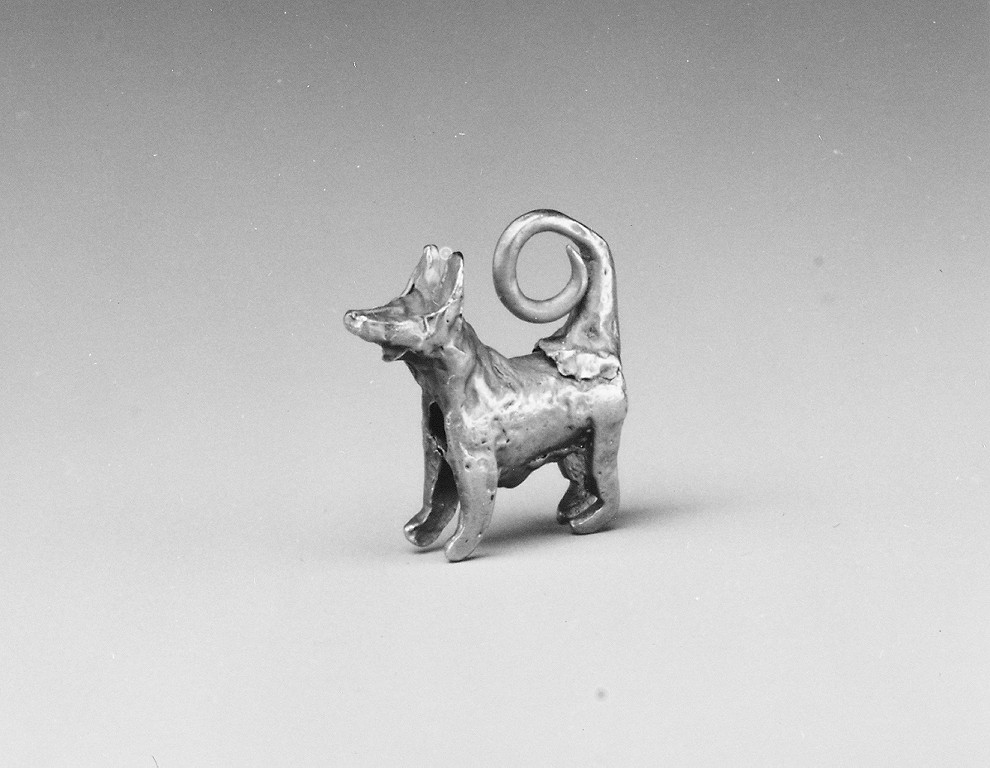
Sculpture belonging to the collections of the Metropolitan Museum of Art.

== Bibliography ==
- Alain-René Duval; Christiane Eluère; Loïc Hurtel; Françoise Tallon (1987). "La Pendeloque au chien de Suse. Étude en laboratoire d'une brasure antique". Revue du Louvre (3): 176–179..
