= Roland de Mecquenem (archaeologist) =

French archaeologist (1877–1957)

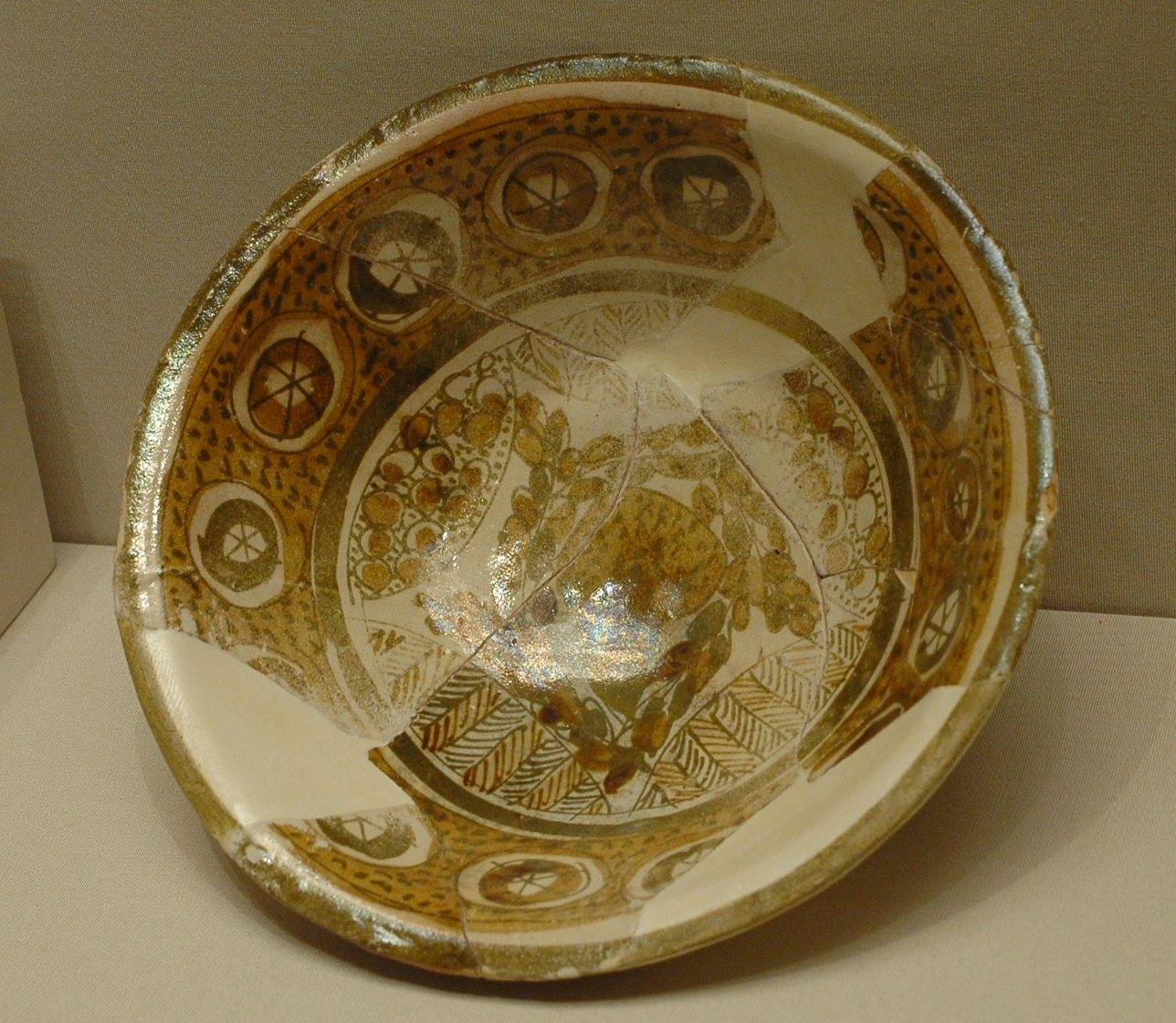
- Earthenware cup with metallic lustre and opaque glaze, overglaze painted, 9th century excavated by Roland de Mecquenem in Susa, 1921.
- Born: 1877; Orléans
- Died: 1957 (aged 79–80)
- Occupation: archaeologist
- Known for: Discovering first known envelope

Roland de Mecquenem (20 August 1877 – 1957) was a French archaeologist who took part in the excavations of Susa in Iran. He was a graduate of the École des Mines.

From 1913 to 1946 he was the director of excavations of the Mission Archéologique de Susiane at Susa. In 1935 he discovered the ancient Elamite complex at Chogha Zanbil. In Persia he excavated numerous artifacts, many of which were sent to the Louvre in Paris.

== Selected works ==
- Céramique peinte de Suze et petits monuments de l'époque archaïque (with Edmond Pottier). 1912.
- Mission en Susiane (with Jean-Vincent Scheil) 1935.
- Archéologie susienne, 1943-47.
- Recherches à Tchogha Zembil, 1953.

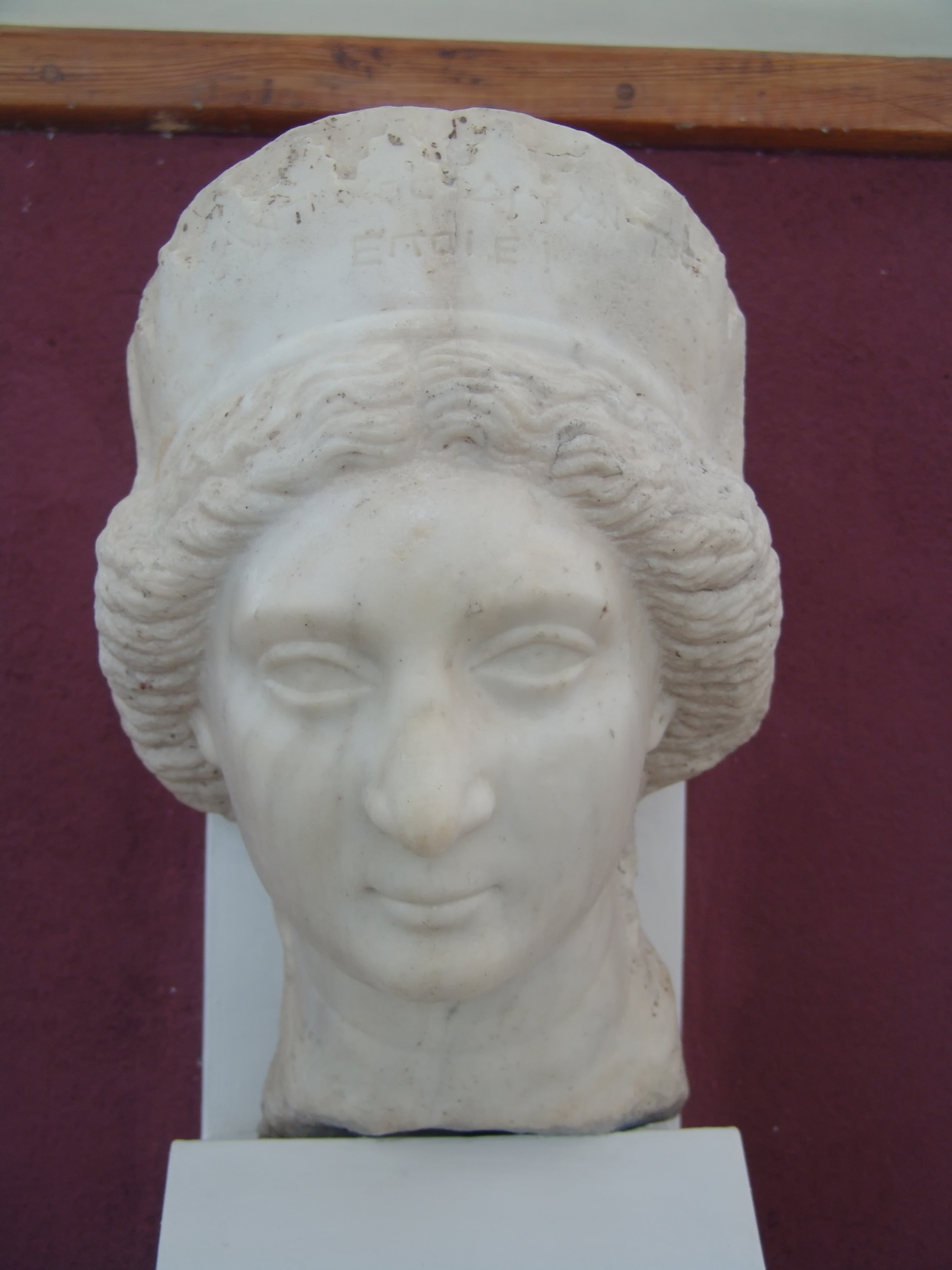
A bust thought to be of Queen Musa, now in the National Museum of Iran, excavated by de Mecquenem in Susa in 1939.

== See also ==
- Petit chien à bélière
