= Pin brazing =

Easy and metallurgically safe metalworking method

Pin brazing is a metallurgically safe method of making electrical connections to steel and ductile iron pipelines as well as other metallic structures, which are to be cathodically protected or electrically earthed.

The pin brazing technique is based primarily upon Electric-arc silver soldering using a specially designed portable pin brazing unit, a hollow brazing pin containing silver solder and flux.

The brazing process is initiated by depressing a trigger on the brazing gun. This, as with most forms of electrical welding, simply completes a circuit through which a DC current is passed. The pin tip is the point of highest resistance at which point an arc is drawn, melting the solder flux whilst simultaneously heating the lug material and the surface of the structure or pipeline to the required soldering temperature.

After approximately 1.5 seconds the circuit is mechanically or electronically broken, the solenoid is de-energised and the brazing pin is pushed forward into the molten pool of brazing alloy. The pin tip, brazing alloy, flux and lug cool into a homogenous unit.

The pin brazing process is well suited for joints between insulated pipe sections, connection to measuring cables, installation of sacrificial anodes and bonding zinc bracelets to offshore pipelines, due to the ease and speed of installation, high mechanical strength and extremely low resistance.

Within a cathodic protection system there are a multitude of connection requirements for anode cables, measuring posts etc., being extremely versatile, the pin brazing system is ideally suited to this. Attachments can be made vertically, horizontally or even overhead. If preferred, threaded pins with nuts can be attached or cable bonded directly onto the pipe by means of a special cable lug which can be crimped on site or supplied complete as a unique integrally crimped attachment. The pin brazing unit contains all the equipment and tools required to make safe cable connections. A welding generator may also be utilized as a power source wherever a battery unit may be impractical or a great many connections need to be made in such places as pipe-coating yards or lay-barges etc.
