= CuproBraze =

CuproBraze is a copper-alloy heat exchanger technology for high-temperature and pressure environments such as those in modern diesel engines. The technology, developed by the International Copper Association (ICA), is licensed for free to heat exchanger manufacturers around the world.

Applications for CuproBraze include charge air coolers, radiators, oil coolers, climate control systems, and heat transfer cores. CuproBraze is suited for charge air coolers and radiators in heavy industry where machinery must operate for long periods of time under harsh conditions without failures. The technology is intended for off-road vehicles, trucks, buses, industrial engines, generators, locomotives, and military equipment. It is also used for light trucks, SUVs and passenger cars with special needs.

Compared with previous heat exchanger models CuproBraze creates new materials for heat exchanger parts that have previously been made of soldered copper/brass plate fin, soldered copper brass serpentine fin, and brazed aluminum serpentine fin to suit more demanding applications. Aluminum heat exchangers are viable and economical for cars, light trucks, and other light-duty applications. However, they are not amenable for environments characterized by high operating temperatures, humidity, vibration, salty corrosive air, and air pollution. In these environments, the additional tensile strength, durability, and corrosion resistance that CuproBraze technology provides are useful.

The CuproBraze technology uses brazing instead of soldering to join copper and brass radiator components. The heat exchangers are made with anneal-resistant copper and brass alloys. The tubes are fabricated from brass strip and coated with a brazing filler material in form of a powder-based paste or an amorphous brazing foil is laid between the tube and fin. There is another method of coating the tube in-line on the tube mill. This is done using the twin wire-arc spray process where the wire is the braze alloy, deposited on the tube as it is being manufactured at 200-400 fpm. This saves one process step of coating the tube later. The coated tubes, along with copper fins, headers and side supports made of brass, are fitted together into a core assembly which is brazed in a furnace.

The technology enables brazed serpentine fins to be used in copper-brass heat exchanger designs. The benefits include tougher joints.

== Performance properties ==
CuproBraze has better than other materials in several aspects, as shown in the table below.

Property	Unit	Cu fin	Brass tube	Al fin	Al tube	Stainless Steel
Density	g/cm3	8.95	8.53	2.75	2.75	7.8 – 8
Thermal conductivity	W/m °C	377	(120)	222	(160)	3 – 24
Tensile strength, room Temp	MPa	330	435	40	145	> 485
Tensile strength, 260 °C	MPa	270	290	31	69	> 475
Thermal expansion	μm/m °C	16.5	19.9	23.6	23.6	11 – 19
Specific heat	J/kg K	377	377	963	963	500
Melting temperature	°C	1083	915	643	643	> 1400
Safety margin in brazing (against core melting)	°C	300	300	30	30	350

=== Thermal performance ===
The ability to withstand elevated temperatures is essential in high-heat applications. Aluminum alloys are challenged at higher temperatures due to their lower melting points. The yield strength of aluminum is compromised above 200 °C. Problems with fatigue cracking are exacerbated at elevated temperatures. CuproBraze heat exchangers can operate correctly under temperatures of 290°C and above. Anneal-resistant copper and brass strip ensure that radiator cores maintain their strength without softening, despite exposures to high brazing temperatures.

=== Heat transfer efficiency ===
Cooling efficiency is a measure of heat rejection from a given space by a heat exchanger. The overall thermal efficiency of a heat exchanger core depends on many factors, such as thermal conductivity of fins and tubes; strength and weight of the fins and tubes; spacing, size, thickness and shape of fins and tubes; velocity of the air passing through the core; and other factors.

The main performance criterion for heat exchangers is cooling efficiency. Heat exchanger cores made from copper and brass can reject more heat per unit volume than any other material. This is why copper-brass heat exchangers generally have a greater cooling efficiency than alternate materials. Brazed copper-brass heat exchangers are also more rugged than soldered copper-brass and alternate materials, including brazed aluminum serpentine.

Air pressure drop is a factor of heat exchanger design. A heat exchanger core with a smaller air pressure drops from the front to the back of the core (i.e., from the windward to the leeward side in a wind tunnel test) is more efficient. Air pressure drops typically are 24% less for CuproBraze versus aluminum heat exchangers. This advantage, responsible for a 6% increase in heat rejection, contributes to CuproBraze's overall greater efficiency.

Since copper's thermal conductivity is higher than aluminum, copper has a higher capacity to dissipate heat. By using thinner material gauges in combination with higher fin density, heat dissipation capacity with CuproBraze can be increased with air pressure drops still at reasonable levels.

=== Size ===
Due to its high heat transfer efficiency, CuproBraze has an efficient heating effect. This is because the same heat rejection level can be achieved with a smaller-sized core. Hence, a significant reduction in frontal area and volume is achievable with CuproBraze versus other materials.

=== Strength and durability ===
Three new alloys were developed to enhance the strength and durability of CuproBraze heat exchangers: 1) an anneal-resistant fin material that maintains its strength after brazing; 2) an anneal-resistant tube alloy that retains its fine grain structure after brazing and provides ductility and fatigue strength in the brazed heat exchanger core; and 3) the brazing alloy. Brazing at 650 °C creates a joint that is stronger than a soldered joint and comparable in strength to a welded joint. Unlike welding, brazing does not melt the base metals. Therefore, brazing is better for joining dissimilar alloys.

CuproBraze has more strength at elevated temperatures than soldered copper-brass or aluminum. Due to the lower thermal expansion of copper versus aluminum, there is less thermal stress during the manufacturing of CuproBraze and in its use as a heat exchanger. CuproBraze heat exchangers have stronger tube-to-header joints than other materials. These braze joints are the very important in heat exchangers and must be leak-free. CuproBraze also has higher tolerances to internal pressures because its thin-gauge high strength materials provide stronger support for the tubes. The material is also less sensitive to bad coolants than aluminum heat exchangers.

Test results demonstrate a much longer fatigue life for CuproBraze joints compared to similar soldered copper-brass or brazed aluminum joints. Stronger joints allow for the use of thinner fins and new radiator and cooler designs.

The copper fins are not easily bent when dirty radiators are washed with high pressure water. Anticorrosive coatings further improve strength and resistance against humidity, sand erosion, and stone impingement on copper fins.

For further information, see: CuproBraze: Durability and reliability (Technology Series): and CupropBraze durability (design criteria series).

=== Emissions ===
New legislation in Europe, Japan and the U.S. call for strong reductions in NO_{X} and particulate emissions from diesel engines used in trucks, buses, power plants, and other heavy equipment. These goals can in part be accomplished by using cleaner-performing turbocharged diesel engines and charge air coolers. Turbocharging enables better power outputs, and charge air coolers allow power to be produced with more efficiency by reducing the temperature of the air charge entering the engine, thereby increasing its density.

The charge air cooler, located between the turbocharger and the engine air inlet manifold, is an air-to-air heat exchanger. It reduces the inlet air temperatures of turbocharged diesel engines from 200 °C to 45 °C while increasing inlet air densities to increase engine efficiencies. Even higher inlet temperatures (246 °C or higher) and boost pressures may be necessary to comply with the emissions standards in the future.

Present-day charge air cooler systems, based on aluminum alloys, experience durability problems at temperatures and pressures necessary to meet the U.S. Tier 4i standards for stationary and mobile engines. Published reports estimate that the average life of an aluminum charge air cooler is currently about 3,500 hours. Aluminum is near its upper technological limit to accommodate higher temperatures and thermal stress levels because the tensile strength of the metal declines rapidly at 150 °C and repetitive thermal cycling between 150 °C and 200 °C substantially weakens it. Thermal cycling creates weak spots in aluminum tubes, which in turn causes charge air coolers to fail. A potential option is to install stainless steel precoolers in aluminum charge air coolers, but limited space and the complexity of this solution is a tampering factor for this option.

A CuproBraze charge air cooler can operate at temperatures as high as 290 °C without creep, fatigue, or other metallurgical problems.

=== Corrosion resistance ===
Exterior corrosion resistance in a heat exchanger is especially important in coastal areas, humid areas, polluted areas, and in mining operations. Corrosion mechanisms of copper and aluminum alloys are different. CuproBraze tube contains 85% copper which provides much resistance against dezincification and stress corrosion cracking. The copper alloys tend to corrode uniformly over entire surfaces at known rates. This predictability of copper corrosion is important for proper maintenance management. Aluminum, on the other hand, is more likely to corrode locally by pitting, resulting eventually in holes.

In accelerated corrosion tests, such as SWAAT for salt spray and marine conditions, CuproBraze performed better than aluminum.

The corrosion resistance of CuproBraze is generally better than soft soldered heat exchangers. This is because the materials in CuproBraze heat exchangers are of equal nobility, so galvanic differences are minimized. On soft soldered heat exchangers, the solder is less noble than fin and tube materials and can suffer from galvanic attack in corrosive environments.

=== Repairability ===
CuproBraze can be repaired with little complexities. This advantage of the technology is important in remote areas where spare parts may be limited. CuproBraze can be repaired with lead-free soft solder (for example 97% tin, 3% copper) or with common silver-containing brazing alloys.

=== Antimicrobial ===
Biofouling is often a problem in HVAC systems that operate in warm, dark, and humid environments. The antimicrobial properties of CuproBraze alloys eliminate foul odors, thereby improving indoor air quality. CuproBraze is being investigated in mobile air conditioner units as a solution to bad odors from fungus and bacteria in aluminum-based heat exchange systems.

== Uses ==
Russian OEMs, such as Kamaz and Ural Automotive Plant, are using CuproBraze radiators and charge air coolers in heavy-duty trucks for off-highway and on-highway applications. Other manufacturers include UAZ and GAZ (Russia) and MAZ (Belarus). The Finnish Radiator Manufacturing Company, also known as FinnRadiator, produces 95% of its radiators and charge air-coolers with CuproBraze for OEM manufacturers of off-road construction equipment. Nakamura Jico Co., Ltd. (Japan) manufactures CuproBraze heat exchangers for construction equipment, locomotives and on-highway trucks. Young Touchstone supplies CuproBraze radiators to MotivePower's diesel-powered commuter train locomotives in North America. Siemens AG Transportation Systems plans to use the technology for its Asia Runner locomotive for South Vietnam and other Asian markets. Bombardier Transportation heat exchangers cool transformer oil in electric-powered locomotives. These huge oil coolers have been used successfully in coal trains for South African Railways. Kohler Power Systems Americas, one of the largest users of diesel engines for power generation, adopted CuproBraze for diesel engine turbocharger air-to-air cooling in its "gen sets".

== See also ==
- Copper in heat exchangers
