= Tudor Heart Pendant =

16th-century gold pendant

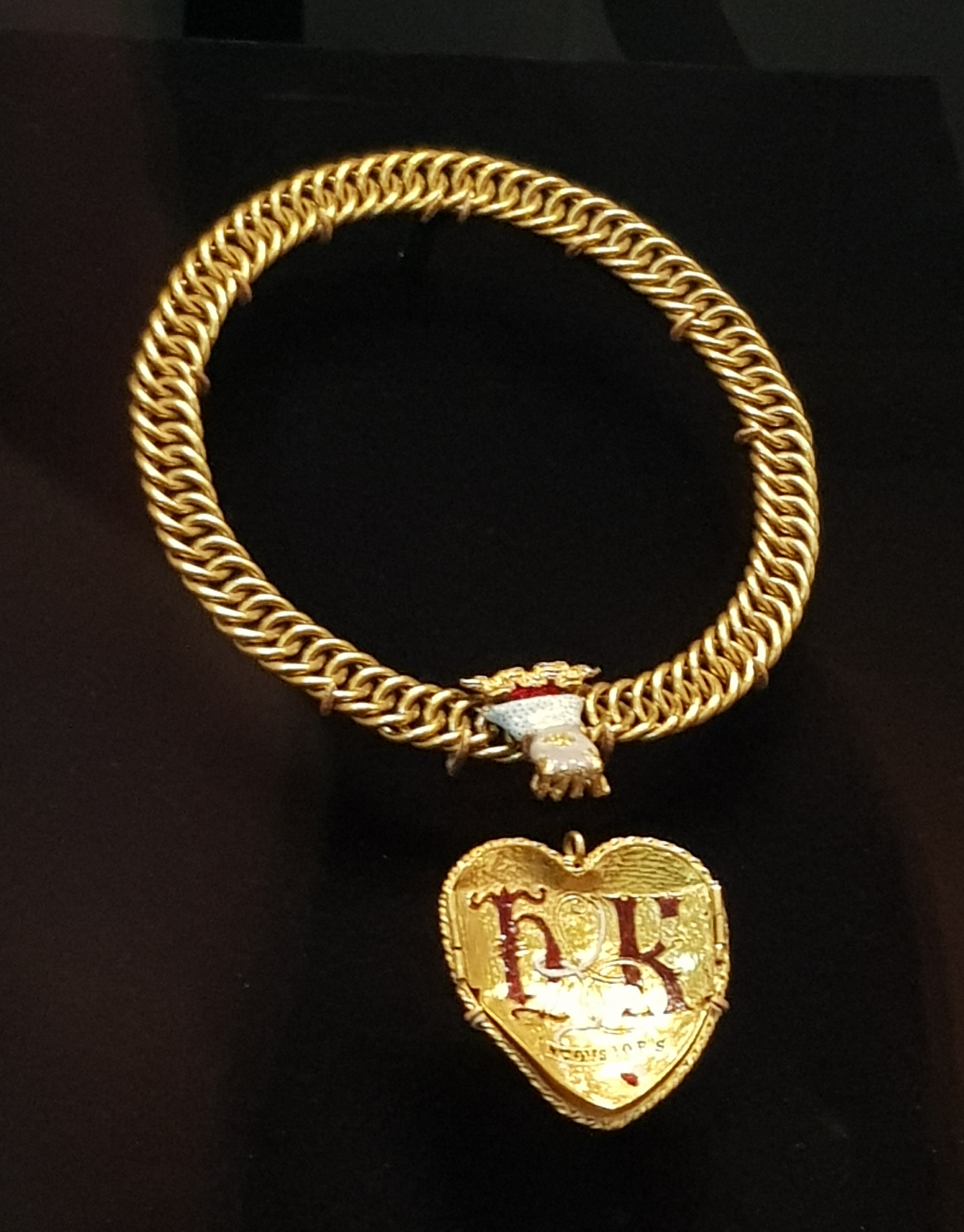
- Tudor Heart Pendant on display at the British Museum
- Material: 24-carat Gold
- Created: Early 16th century
- Period/culture: Early Modern Britain
- Discovered: 2019; Warwickshire
- Present location: British Museum

The Tudor Heart Pendant is an early 16th century gold jewel associated with the marriage of King Henry VIII and Catherine of Aragon. The pendant, decorated with the Tudor rose and Catherine’s pomegranate emblem, was discovered in Warwickshire in 2019 by a metal detectorist and declared treasure under the Treasure Act 1996. After a public fundraising campaign, it was acquired by the British Museum in 2026.

== Description ==
The pendant is a heart-shaped gold jewel dating to the early 16th century and associated with King Henry VIII and Catherine of Aragon. The pendant is made of 24-carat gold and is suspended from a chain of 75 links.

The front of the pendant is decorated with a red and white Tudor rose alongside a pomegranate bush, the personal emblem of Catherine of Aragon. The reverse bears the initials “H” and “K,” referring to Henry and Catherine. A banner across the pendant carries the inscription “TOVS IORS,” a stylized form of the French word toujours (“always”), interpreted as a pun meaning “always” or “all yours.”

The pendant was found with an enamelled hand connecting it to a gold curb chain. The hand also functions as the chain's clasp. Inventories of the jewels of Henry VIII made by William Compton mention a carcanet collar with hands suspending balas rubies, and another list includes a carcanet with hands holding a hearts with a hanging pearl. A jewel owned by Mary, Queen of Scots, known as the "Aberdeen jewel", includes a hand holding a garland.

== Discovery ==
The pendant was discovered in 2019 in Warwickshire by metal detectorist Charlie Clarke, who had taken up the hobby only six months earlier. After uncovering the object in a cultivated field, Clarke reported the find in accordance with the Treasure Act 1996.

Curators at the British Museum described the pendant as one of the most significant Renaissance jewelry finds discovered in Britain in more than two decades.

== Research and interpretation ==
Initial research conducted by the British Museum identified the pendant as an early 16th-century object connected with Henry VIII and Catherine of Aragon. Scientific analysis confirmed the authenticity of the jewel, although no documentary evidence has been found linking it directly to either monarch.

One hypothesis suggests that the pendant may have been produced for a court tournament or ceremonial celebration. Scholars have proposed that it could have been created for festivities marking the 1518 betrothal of the couple’s daughter, Princess Mary, to the French dauphin. Such elaborate “costume jewelry” was sometimes commissioned by Henry VIII for court festivities and tournaments. Records mention that a London goldsmith Robert Amadas supplied letters and hearts for a tournament in 1511.

== Acquisition by the British Museum ==
After being declared treasure, the pendant was valued at £3.5 million. The British Museum launched a public fundraising campaign to acquire the object for the national collection, which concluded in February 2026.

More than 45,000 members of the public contributed to the appeal, raising approximately £360,000. Additional funding was provided by organizations including the Art Fund and the American Friends of the British Museum. Following the successful campaign, the museum acquired the pendant in 2026, after which it went on display and is expected to tour museums across the United Kingdom.

== Gallery ==
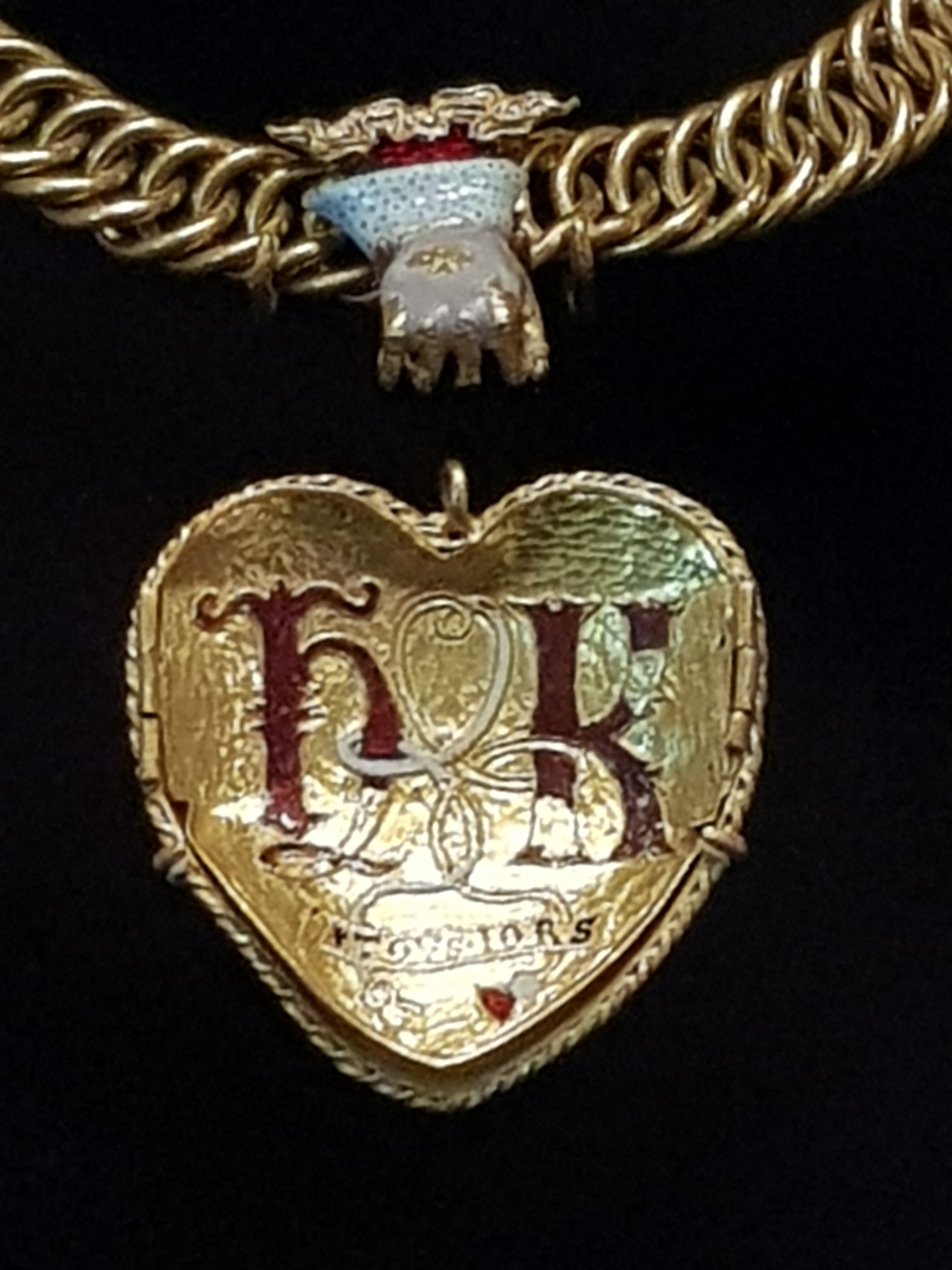
Detail of the pendant

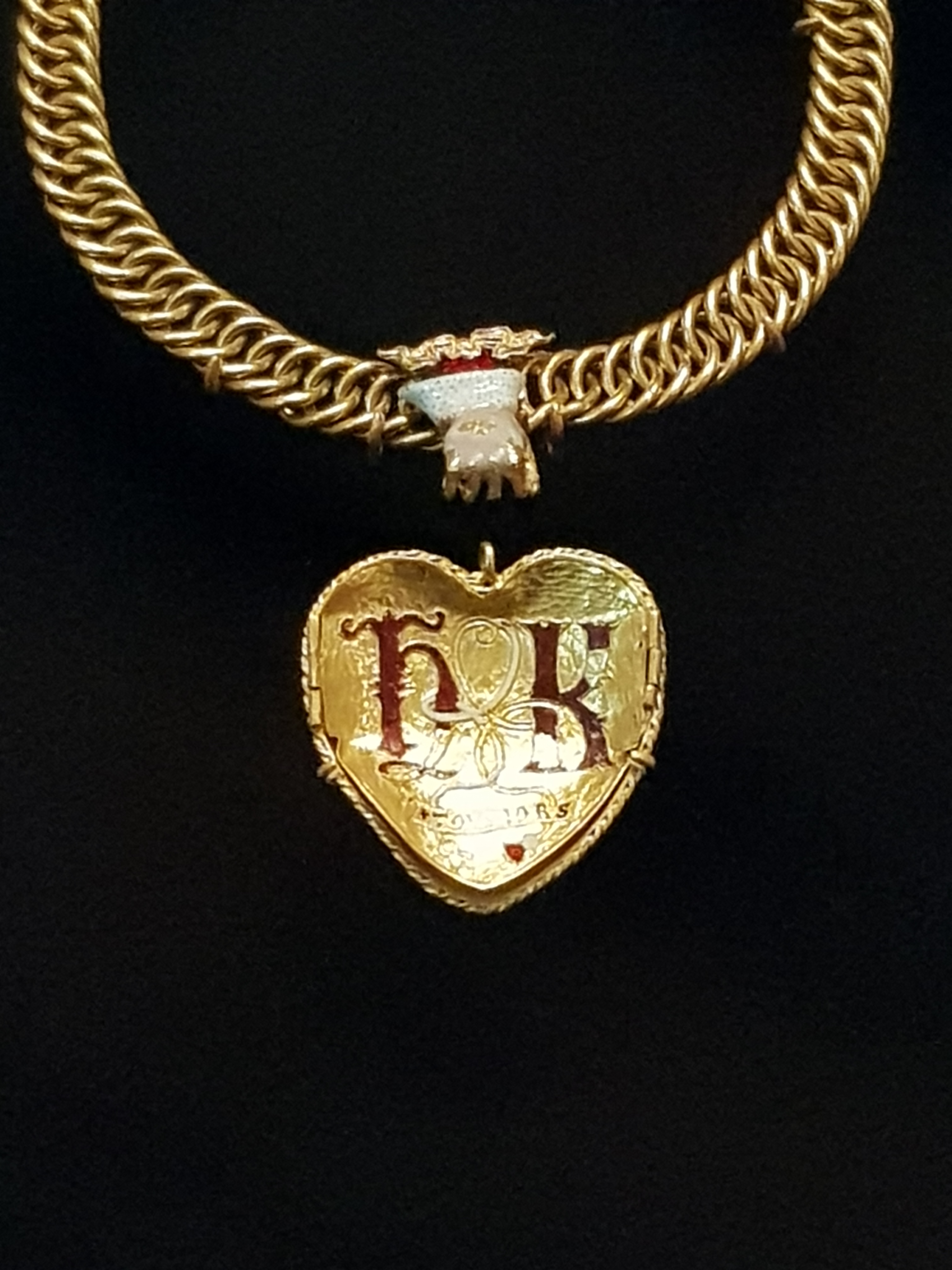
Another view of the necklace and pendant

== See also ==
- Middleham Jewel
- Dunstable Swan Jewel
- Alfred Jewel
