= Induction brazing =

Induction brazing is a process in which two or more materials are joined together by a filler metal that has a lower melting point than the base materials using induction heating. In induction heating, usually ferrous materials are heated rapidly from the electromagnetic field that is created by the alternating current from an induction coil.

== Materials and applications ==
"Induction brazing is suitable for many metallic materials, with magnetic materials being heated more readily", according to media. Furthermore, in regard to use with "ceramic materials [...], heating will most likely occur by conduction from surrounding metallic parts, or the use of a susceptor".

According to Ambrell Group Application Labs talking about filler metals: Silver is frequently used for induction brazing because of its low melting point. Silver-copper eutectic brazes have melting temperatures between 1100°F and 1650°F. Aluminum braze, the least common, has a melting temperature of 1050°F to 1140°F. Copper braze, the least expensive, has a melting temperature of 1300°F to 2150°F. (p1)

The filler can be manually applied but because of the more common semiautomatic production a preloaded joint is more commonly used to speed the operation and help to keep a more uniform bond.

== Benefits ==
There are specific reasons to use induction heating for industrial brazing. These include selective heating, better joint quality, reduced oxidation and acid cleaning, faster heating cycles, more consistent results and suitability for large volume production.

=== Selective heating ===
Induction heating can be targeted to provide heat to very small areas within tight production tolerances. Only those areas of the part in close proximity to the joint are heated; the rest of the part is not affected. Since there is no direct contact with the part, there is no opportunity for breakage. The life of the fixturing is substantially increased because problems due to repeated exposure to heat (such as distortion and metal fatigue) are eliminated. This advantage becomes particularly important with high-temperature brazing processes.

With efficient coil design, careful fixturing and consistent part placement, it is possible to simultaneously heat different areas of the same part.

=== Better quality joints ===
Induction heating produces clean, leak proof joints by preventing the filler from flowing in areas that it shouldn't flow. This ability to create clean and controllable joints is one of the reasons that induction brazing is being used extensively for high-precision, high-reliability applications.

=== Reduced oxidation and cleaning ===
Flame heating in a normal atmosphere causes oxidation, scaling and carbon build up on the parts. To clean the parts, applications of joint-weakening flux and expensive acid cleaning baths have traditionally been required. Batch vacuum furnaces solve these problems, but have significant limitations of their own because of their large size, poor efficiency and lack of quality control. Brazing with induction reduces both oxidation and costly cleaning requirements, especially when a rapid cool-down cycle is used.

=== Fast heating cycles ===
Because the induction heating cycle is very short in comparison to flame brazing, more parts can be processed in the same amount of time, and less heat is released to the surrounding environment. “An induction brazing system quickly delivers highly localized heat to minimize part warpage and distortion. Brazing in a controlled vacuum or in an inert protective atmosphere can significantly improve overall part quality and eliminate costly part cleaning procedures” (Induction Atmospheres, 1).

=== Consistent results ===
Induction brazing is a very repeatable process because variables such as time, temperature, alloy, fixturing, and part positioning are very controllable. The internal power supply of the RF power supply can be used to control cycle time, and temperature control can be accomplished with pyrometers, visual temperature sensors or thermocouples.

For processes, which involve medium to high production runs of the same parts, an automated part handling system is often utilized to further improve consistency and maximize productivity. For the most part, induction brazing and soldering is done in an open-air environment but it can also be done in a controlled atmosphere when necessary to keep the parts completely clean and free of oxidation. Induction brazing generally works best with two pieces of similar metal. Dissimilar metals can also be joined by induction heating but they require special attention and techniques. This is due to differences in the materials' resistivity, relative magnetic permeability and coefficients of thermal expansion. (p1)

== General temperatures and times ==
Process	Time	Temperature (°F)
Brazing Stainless Steel Tubes	20 seconds	1330°F
Brazing Stainless Steel Orthodontic Parts	1 second	1300°F
Brazing Hydraulic Hose Assemblies	7 seconds	2200°F
Brazing Metering Plates to Turbine Blades With Nickel	5 minutes	2000°F
Brazing Copper Tube Assemblies	45 seconds	1450°F
Brazing Stainless Steel to Brass	7 seconds	1325°F
Brazing Stainless Steel to Titanium	80 seconds	2000°F
Brazing Stainless Steel Dental Tools	10 seconds	1400°F(p1)
