= Brazing =

Metal-joining technique

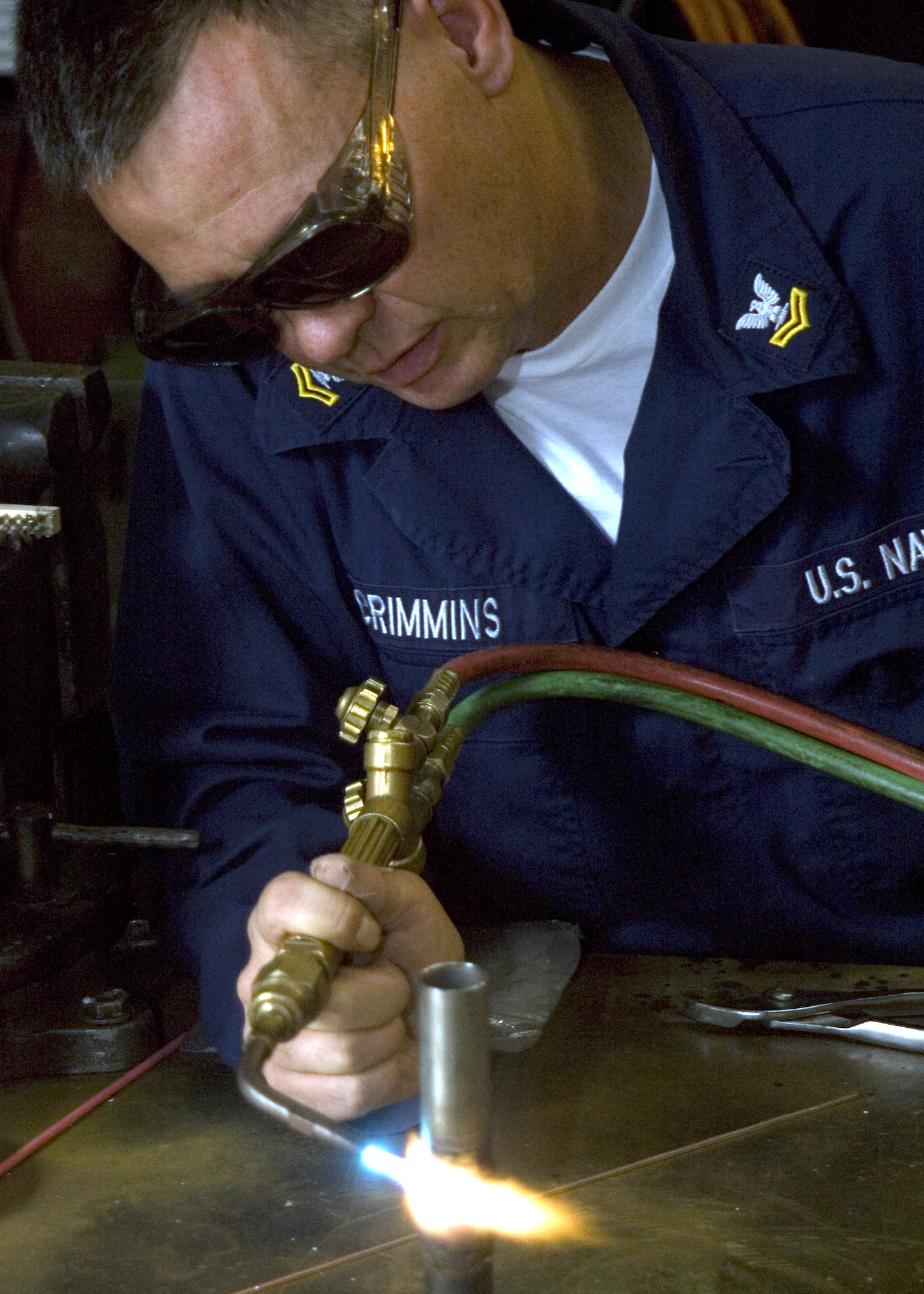
Brazing practice

Brazing is a metal-joining process in which two or more metal items are joined by melting a filler metal which flows into the joint, with the filler metal having a lower melting point than the adjoining metal.

During the brazing process, the filler metal flows into the gap between close-fitting parts by capillary action. The filler metal is brought slightly above its melting (liquidus) temperature while protected by a suitable atmosphere, usually a flux. It then flows over the base metal (in a process known as wetting) and is then cooled to join the work pieces together.

Brazing differs from welding in that it does not involve melting the work pieces. In welding, the original metal pieces can be fused together without additional filler metal.

Brazing differs from soldering through the use of a higher temperature. The principle of joining with filler metal is the same, but solder has a specific composition and lower melting point allowing work on delicate components such as electronics with minimal metallurgic reaction. The joints from soldering are weaker.

Brazing joins the same or different metals with considerable strength.

== Advantages and Disadvantages ==
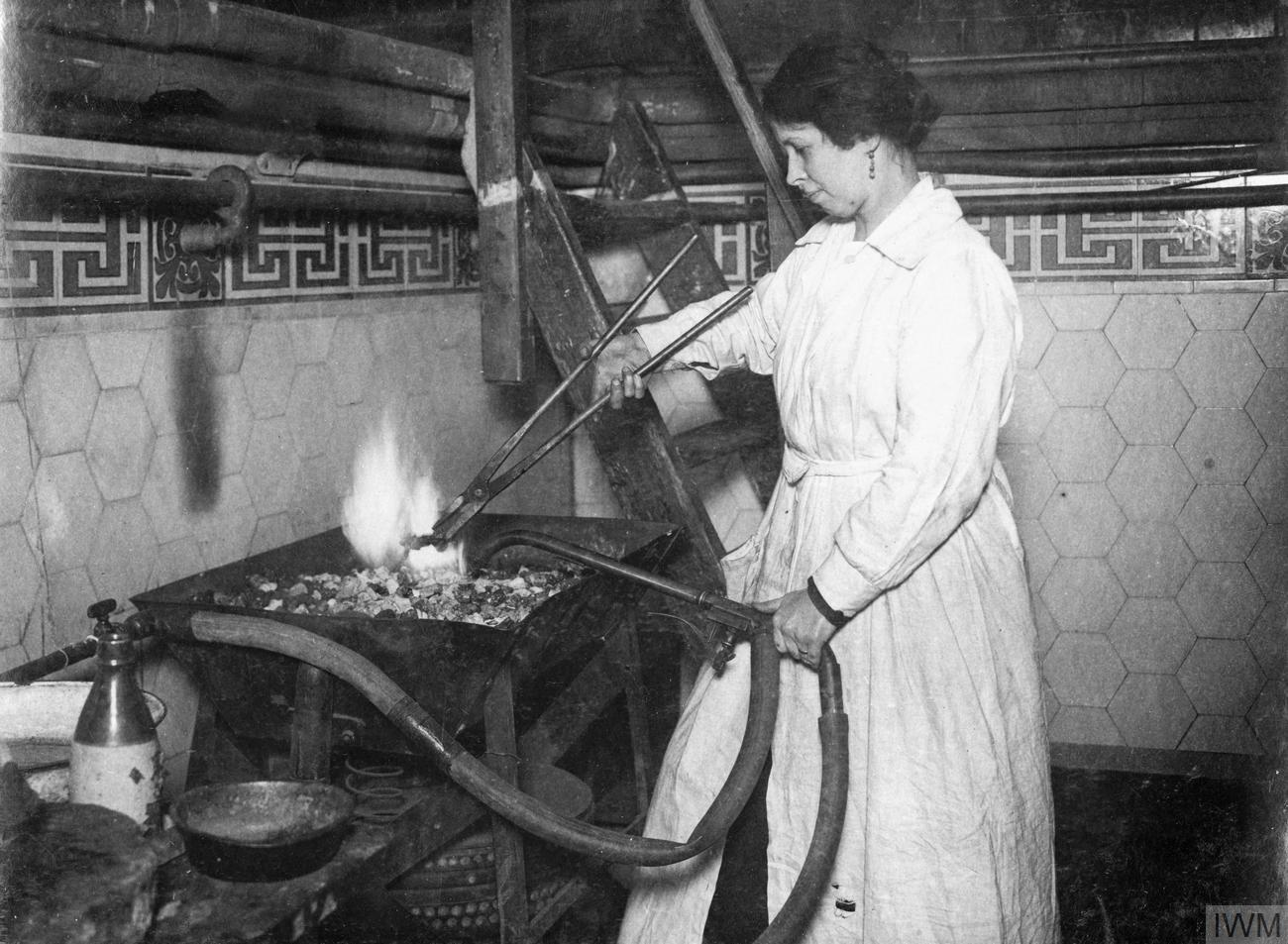
A worker brazing metal tools in a British workshop during the First World War

Brazing has many advantages over other metal-joining techniques, such as welding. Since brazing does not melt the base metal of the joint, it allows much tighter control over tolerances and produces a clean joint without the need for secondary finishing. Additionally, dissimilar metals and non-metals (i.e. metalized ceramics) can be brazed. In general, brazing also produces less thermal distortion than welding due to the uniform heating of a brazed piece. Complex and multi-part assemblies can be brazed cost-effectively. Welded joints must sometimes be ground flush, a costly secondary operation that brazing does not require because it produces a clean joint. Another advantage is that the brazing can be coated or clad for protective purposes. Finally, brazing is easily adapted to mass production and it is easy to automate because the individual process parameters are less sensitive to variation.

One of the main disadvantages is the lack of joint strength as compared to a welded joint due to the softer filler metals used. The strength of the brazed joint is likely to be less than that of the base metal(s) but greater than the filler metal. Another disadvantage is that brazed joints can be damaged under high service temperatures. Brazed joints require a high degree of base-metal cleanliness when done in an industrial setting. Some brazing applications require the use of adequate fluxing agents to control cleanliness. The joint color is often different from that of the base metal, creating an aesthetic disadvantage.

High-quality brazed joints require that parts be closely fitted with base metal surfaces exceptionally clean and free of oxides. In most cases, joint clearances of 0.03 to 0.08 mm (0.0012 to 0.0031 in) are recommended for the best capillary action and joint strength; in some brazing operations, however, it is not uncommon to have joint clearances around 0.6 mm (0.024 in). Cleanliness of the brazing surfaces is also important, as any contamination can cause poor wetting (flow). The two main methods for cleaning parts, prior to brazing, are chemical cleaning and abrasive or mechanical cleaning. In the case of mechanical cleaning it is important to maintain the proper surface roughness, as wetting on a rough surface occurs much more readily than on a smooth surface of the same geometry.

Another consideration is the effect of temperature and time on the quality of brazed joints. As the temperature of the braze alloy is increased, the alloying and wetting action of the filler metal increases as well. In general, the brazing temperature selected must be above the melting point of the filler metal. However, several factors influence the joint designer's temperature selection. The best temperature is usually selected to:

- Minimize braze temperature
- Minimize any heat effects on the assembly
- Minimize filler metal/base metal interaction
- Maximize the life of any fixtures or jigs used

In some cases, a worker may select a higher temperature to accommodate other factors in the design (e.g., to allow use of a different filler metal, or to control metallurgical effects, or to sufficiently remove surface contamination). The effect of time on the brazed joint primarily affects the extent to which these effects are present. In general, however, most production processes are selected to minimize brazing time and associated costs. This is not always the case, however, since in some non-production settings, time and cost are secondary to other joint attributes (e.g., strength, appearance).

== Techniques ==
Brazing and soldering processes classification chart

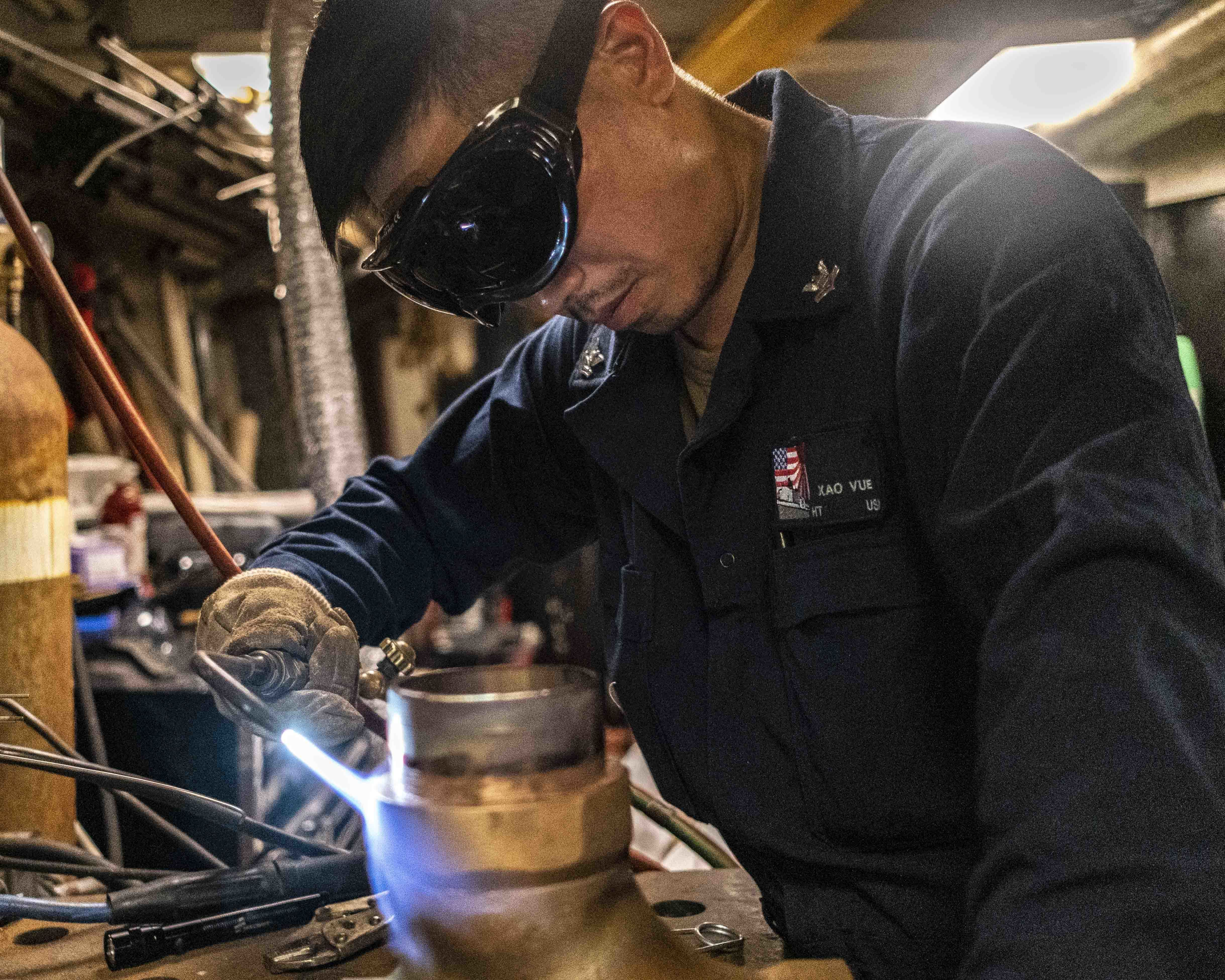
A US Navy maintenance technician torch brazes a steel pipe

There are many heating methods available to accomplish brazing operations. The most important factor in choosing a heating method is achieving efficient transfer of heat throughout the joint and doing so within the heat capacity of the individual base metals used. The geometry of the braze joint is also a crucial factor to consider, as is the rate and volume of production required. The easiest way to categorize brazing methods is to group them by heating method. Here are some of the most common:

- Torch brazing
- Furnace brazing
- Induction brazing
- Dip brazing
- Resistance brazing
- Infrared brazing
- Blanket brazing
- Electron beam and laser brazing
- Braze welding

These heating methods are classified through localised and diffuse heating techniques and offer advantages based on their different applications.

=== Torch brazing ===
Torch brazing is by far the most common method of mechanized brazing in use. It is best used in small production volumes or in specialized operations, and in some countries, it accounts for a majority of the brazing taking place. There are three main categories of torch brazing in use: manual, machine, and automatic torch brazing.

Manual torch brazing is a procedure where the heat is applied using a gas flame placed on or near the joint being brazed. The torch can either be hand held or held in a fixed position depending on whether the operation is completely manual or has some level of automation. Manual brazing is most commonly used on small production volumes or in applications where the part size or configuration makes other brazing methods impossible. The main drawback is the high labor cost associated with the method as well as the operator skill required to obtain quality brazed joints. The use of flux or self-fluxing material is required to prevent oxidation. Torch brazing of copper can be done without the use of flux if it is brazed with a torch using oxygen and hydrogen gas, rather than oxygen and other flammable gases.

Machine torch brazing is commonly used where a repetitive braze operation is being carried out. This method is a mix of both automated and manual operations with an operator often placing brazes material, flux and jigging parts while the machine mechanism carries out the actual braze. The advantage of this method is that it reduces the high labor and skill requirement of manual brazing. The use of flux is also required for this method as there is no protective atmosphere, and it is best suited to small to medium production volumes.

Automatic torch brazing is a method that almost eliminates the need for manual labor in the brazing operation, except for loading and unloading of the machine. The main advantages of this method are: a high production rate, uniform braze quality, and reduced operating cost. The equipment used is essentially the same as that used for Machine torch brazing, with the main difference being that the machinery replaces the operator in the part preparation.

=== Furnace brazing ===
Furnace brazing schematic

Furnace brazing is a semi-automatic process used widely in industrial brazing operations due to its adaptability to mass production and use of unskilled labor. There are many advantages of furnace brazing over other heating methods that make it ideal for mass production. One main advantage is the ease with which it can produce large numbers of small parts that are easily jigged or self-locating. The process also offers the benefits of a controlled heat cycle (allowing use of parts that might distort under localized heating) and no need for post braze cleaning. Common atmospheres used include: inert, reducing or vacuum atmospheres all of which protect the part from oxidation. Some other advantages include: low unit cost when used in mass production, close temperature control, and the ability to braze multiple joints at once. Furnaces are typically heated using either electric, gas or oil depending on the type of furnace and application. However, some of the disadvantages of this method include: high capital equipment cost, more difficult design considerations and high power consumption.

There are four main types of furnaces used in brazing operations: batch type; continuous; retort with controlled atmosphere; and vacuum.

A batch type furnace has relatively low initial equipment costs, and can heat each part load separately. It can be turned on and off at will, which reduces operating expenses when it's not in use. These furnaces are suited to medium to large volume production, and offer a large degree of flexibility in type of parts that can be brazed. Either controlled atmospheres or flux can be used to control oxidation and cleanliness of parts.

Continuous type furnaces are best suited to a steady flow of similar-sized parts through the furnace. These furnaces are often conveyor fed, moving parts through the hot zone at a controlled speed. It is common to use either controlled atmosphere or pre-applied flux in continuous furnaces. In particular, these furnaces offer the benefit of very low manual labor requirements and so are best suited to large scale production operations.

Retort-type furnaces differ from other batch-type furnaces in that they make use of a sealed lining called a "retort". The retort is generally sealed with either a gasket or is welded shut and filled completely with the desired atmosphere and then heated externally by conventional heating elements. Due to the high temperatures involved, the retort is usually made of heat resistant alloys that resist oxidation. Retort furnaces are often either used in a batch or semi-continuous versions.

Vacuum furnaces is a relatively economical method of oxide prevention and is most often used to braze materials with very stable oxides (aluminum, titanium and zirconium) that cannot be brazed in atmosphere furnaces. Vacuum brazing is also used heavily with refractory materials and other exotic alloy combinations unsuited to atmosphere furnaces. Due to the absence of flux or a reducing atmosphere, the part cleanliness is critical when brazing in a vacuum. The three main types of vacuum furnace are: single-wall hot retort, double-walled hot retort, and cold-wall retort. Typical vacuum levels for brazing range from pressures of 1.3 to 0.13 pascals (10^{−2} to 10^{−3} Torr) to 0.00013 Pa (10^{−6} Torr) or lower. Vacuum furnaces are most commonly batch-type, and they are suited to medium and high production volumes.

=== Silver brazing ===
Silver brazing, sometimes known as hard soldering, is brazing using a silver alloy based filler. These silver alloys consist of many different percentages of silver and other metals, such as copper, zinc and cadmium.

Brazing is widely used in the tool industry to fasten "hard metal" (carbide, ceramics, cermet, and similar) tips to tools such as saw blades. "Pretinning" is often done: the braze alloy is melted onto the hard metal tip, which is placed next to the steel and remelted. Pretinning gets around the problem that hard metals are difficult to wet.

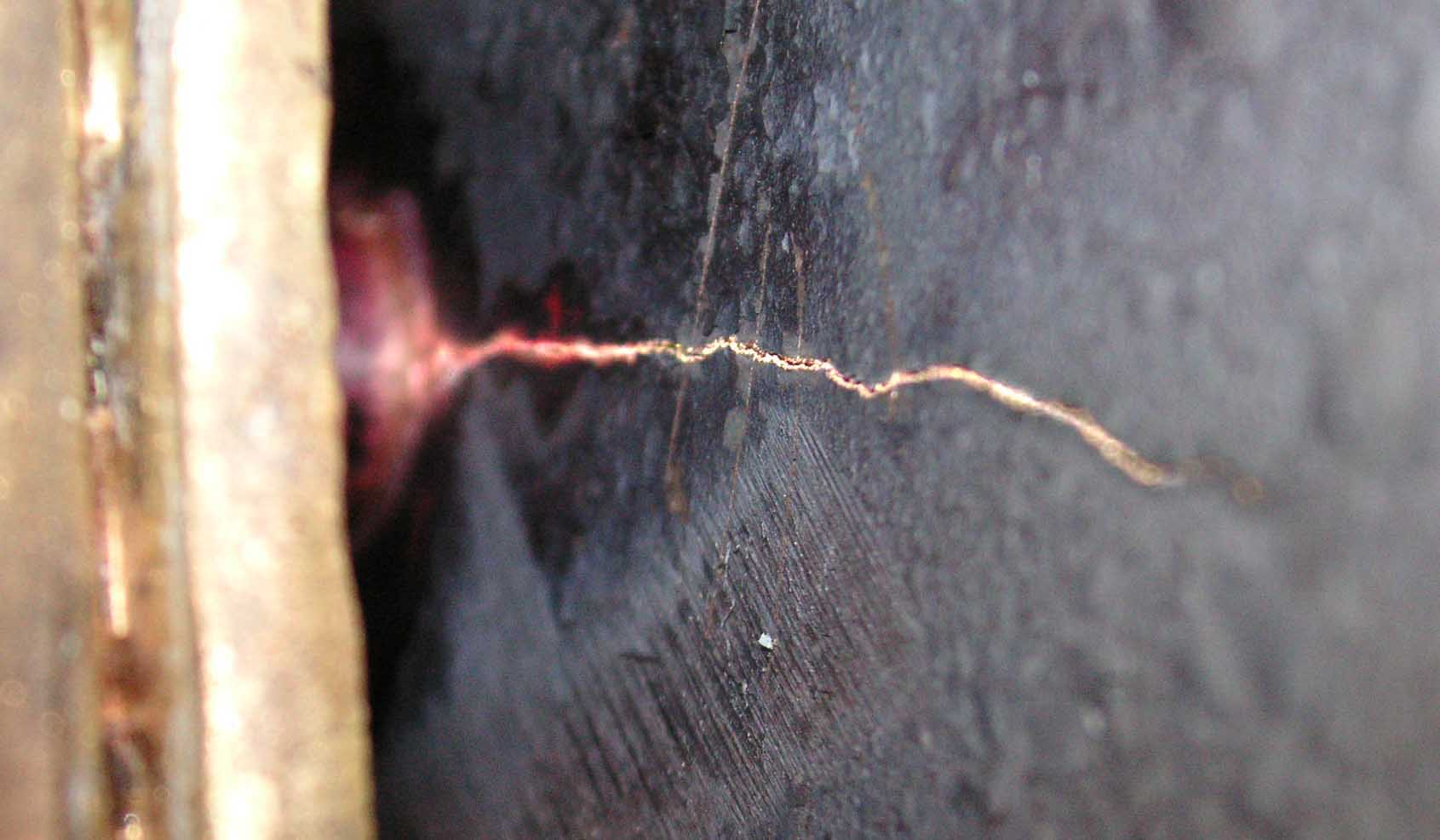
Crack in 90–10 Cu–Ni metal plate due to stresses during silver brazing

Brazed hard metal joints are typically two to seven mils thick. The braze alloy joins the materials and compensates for the difference in their expansion rates. It also provides a cushion between the hard carbide tip and the hard steel, which softens impact and prevents tip loss and damage—much as a vehicle's suspension helps prevent damage to the tires and the vehicle. Finally, the braze alloy joins the other two materials to create a composite structure, much as layers of wood and glue create plywood. The standard for braze joint strength in many industries is a joint that is stronger than either base material, so that when under stress, one or other of the base materials fails before the joint. Silver brazing may cause defects in certain alloys, e.g. stress-induced inter-granular cracking in copper-nickel.

One special silver brazing method is called pinbrazing or pin brazing. It has been developed especially for connecting cables to railway track or for cathodic protection installations. The method uses a silver- and flux-containing brazing pin, which is melted in the eye of a cable lug. The equipment is normally powered from batteries.

=== Braze welding ===
Braze welding is the use of a bronze or brass filler rod coated with flux to join steel workpieces. The equipment needed for braze welding is basically identical to the equipment used in brazing. Since braze welding usually requires more heat than brazing, acetylene or methylacetylene-propadiene gas (MAPP gas) fuel is commonly used. The name comes from the fact that no capillary action is used.

Braze welding has many advantages over fusion welding. It allows the joining of dissimilar metals, minimization of heat distortion, and can reduce the need for extensive pre-heating. Additionally, since the metals joined are not melted in the process, the components retain their original shape; edges and contours are not eroded or changed by the formation of a fillet. Another effect of braze welding is the elimination of stored-up stresses that are often present in fusion welding. This is extremely important in the repair of large castings. The disadvantages are the loss of strength when subjected to high temperatures and the inability to withstand high stresses.

Carbide, cermet and ceramic tips are plated and then joined to steel to make tipped band saws. The plating acts as a braze alloy.

=== Cast iron "welding" ===
The "welding" of cast iron is usually a brazing operation, with a filler rod made chiefly of nickel being used although true welding with cast iron rods is also available. Ductile cast iron pipe may be also "cadwelded," a process that connects joints by means of a small copper wire fused into the iron when previously ground down to the bare metal, parallel to the iron joints being formed as per hub pipe with neoprene gasket seals. The purpose behind this operation is to use electricity along the copper for keeping underground pipes warm in cold climates.

=== Vacuum brazing ===
Vacuum brazing is a material joining technique that offers significant advantages: extremely clean, superior, flux-free braze joints of high integrity and strength. The process can be expensive because it must be performed inside a vacuum chamber vessel. Temperature uniformity is maintained on the work piece when heating in a vacuum, greatly reducing residual stresses due to slow heating and cooling cycles. This, in turn, can significantly improve the thermal and mechanical properties of the material, thus providing unique heat treatment capabilities. One such capability is heat-treating or age-hardening the workpiece while performing a metal-joining process, all in a single furnace thermal cycle.

Products that are most commonly vacuum-brazed include aluminum cold plates, plate-fin heat exchangers, and flat tube heat exchangers.

Vacuum brazing is often conducted in a furnace; this means that several joints can be made at once because the whole workpiece reaches the brazing temperature. The heat is transferred using radiation, as many other methods cannot be used in a vacuum.

=== Dip brazing ===
Dip brazing is especially suited for brazing aluminium because air is excluded, thus preventing the formation of oxides. The parts to be joined are fixtured and the brazing compound applied to the mating surfaces, typically in slurry form. Then the assemblies are dipped into a bath of molten salt (typically NaCl, KCl and other compounds), which functions as both heat transfer medium and flux. Many dip brazed parts are used in heat transfer applications for the aerospace industry.

== Filler materials ==
A variety of alloys are used as filler metals for brazing depending on the intended use or application method. In general, braze alloys are composed of three or more metals to form an alloy with the desired properties. The filler metal for a particular application is chosen based on its ability to: wet the base metals, withstand the service conditions required, and melt at a lower temperature than the base metals or at a very specific temperature.

Braze alloy is generally available as rod, ribbon, powder, paste, cream, wire and preforms (such as stamped washers). Depending on the application, the filler material can be pre-placed at the desired location or applied during the heating cycle. For manual brazing, wire and rod forms are generally used as they are the easiest to apply while heating. In the case of furnace brazing, the alloy is usually placed beforehand since the process is usually highly automated. Some of the more common types of filler metals used are

- Aluminum-silicon
- Copper
- Copper-silver
- Copper-zinc (brass)
- Copper-tin (bronze)
- Gold-silver
- Nickel alloy
- Silver
- Amorphous brazing foil using nickel, iron, copper, silicon, boron, phosphorus, etc.

Some brazes come in the form of trifoils, laminated foils of a carrier metal clad with a layer of braze at each side. The center metal is often copper; its role is to act as a carrier for the alloy, to absorb mechanical stresses due to e.g. differential thermal expansion of dissimilar materials (e.g. a carbide tip and a steel holder), and to act as a diffusion barrier (e.g. to stop diffusion of aluminum from aluminum bronze to steel when brazing these two).

Brazing alloys form several distinct groups; the alloys in the same group have similar properties and uses.

Pure metals
Unalloyed. Often noble metals – silver, gold, palladium.
Ag-Cu
Silver-copper. Good melting properties. Silver enhances flow. Eutectic alloy used for furnace brazing. Copper-rich alloys prone to stress cracking by ammonia.
Ag-Zn
Silver-zinc. Similar to Cu-Zn, used in jewelry due to its high silver content so that the product is compliant with hallmarking. The color matches silver, and it is resistant to ammonia-containing silver-cleaning fluids.
Cu-Zn (brass)
Copper-zinc. General purpose, used for joining steel and cast iron. Corrosion resistance usually inadequate for copper, silicon bronze, copper-nickel, and stainless steel. Reasonably ductile. High vapor pressure due to volatile zinc, unsuitable for furnace brazing. Copper-rich alloys prone to stress cracking by ammonia.
Ag-Cu-Zn
Silver-copper-zinc. Lower melting point than Ag-Cu for same Ag content. Combines advantages of Ag-Cu and Cu-Zn. At above 40% Zn the ductility and strength drop, so only lower-zinc alloys of this type are used. At above 25% zinc less ductile copper-zinc and silver-zinc phases appear. Copper content above 60% yields reduced strength and melts above 900 °C. Silver content above 85% yields reduced strength, high liquidus and high cost. Copper-rich alloys prone to stress cracking by ammonia. Silver-rich brazes (above 67.5% Ag) are hallmarkable and used in jewellery; alloys with lower silver content are used for engineering purposes. Alloys with copper-zinc ratio of about 60:40 contain the same phases as brass and match its color; they are used for joining brass. Small amount of nickel improves strength and corrosion resistance and promotes wetting of carbides. Addition of manganese together with nickel increases fracture toughness. Addition of cadmium yields Ag-Cu-Zn-Cd alloys with improved fluidity and wetting and lower melting point; however cadmium is toxic. Addition of tin can play mostly the same role.
Cu-P
Copper-phosphorus. Widely used for copper and copper alloys. Does not require flux for copper. Can be also used with silver, tungsten, and molybdenum. Copper-rich alloys prone to stress cracking by ammonia.
Ag-Cu-P
Like Cu-P, with improved flow. Better for larger gaps. More ductile, better electrical conductivity. Copper-rich alloys prone to stress cracking by ammonia.
Au-Ag
Gold-silver. Noble metals. Used in jewelry.
Au-Cu
Gold-copper. Continuous series of solid solutions. Readily wet many metals, including refractory ones. Narrow melting ranges, good fluidity. Frequently used in jewellery. Alloys with 40–90% of gold harden on cooling but stay ductile. Nickel improves ductility. Silver lowers melting point but worsens corrosion resistance. To maintain corrosion resistance, gold must be kept above 60%. High-temperature strength and corrosion resistance can be improved by further alloying, e.g., with chromium, palladium, manganese, and molybdenum. Added vanadium allows wetting ceramics. Gold-copper has low vapor pressure.
Au-Ni
Gold-nickel. Continuous series of solid solutions. Wider melting range than Au-Cu alloys but better corrosion resistance and improved wetting. Frequently alloyed with other metals to reduce proportion of gold while maintaining properties. Copper may be added to lower gold proportion, chromium to compensate for loss of corrosion resistance, and boron for improving wetting impaired by the chromium. Generally no more than 35% Ni is used, as higher Ni/Au ratios have too wide melting range. Low vapor pressure.
Au-Pd
Gold-palladium. Improved corrosion resistance over Au-Cu and Au-Ni alloys. Used for joining superalloys and refractory metals for high-temperature applications, e.g. jet engines. Expensive. May be substituted for by cobalt-based brazes. Low vapor pressure.
Pd
Palladium. Good high-temperature performance, high corrosion resistance (less than gold), high strength (more than gold). usually alloyed with nickel, copper, or silver. Forms solid solutions with most metals, does not form brittle intermetallics. Low vapor pressure.
Ni
Nickel alloys, even more numerous than silver alloys. High strength. Lower cost than silver alloys. Good high-temperature performance, good corrosion resistance in moderately aggressive environments. Often used for stainless steels and heat-resistant alloys. Embrittled with sulfur and some lower-melting point metals, e.g. zinc. Boron, phosphorus, silicon and carbon lower melting point and rapidly diffuse to base metals. This allows diffusion brazing, and lets the joint be used above the brazing temperature. Borides and phosphides form brittle phases. Amorphous preforms can be made by rapid solidification.
Co
Cobalt alloys. Good high-temperature corrosion resistance, possible alternative to Au-Pd brazes. Low workability at low temperatures, preforms prepared by rapid solidification.
Al-Si
Aluminum-silicon. For brazing aluminum.
Active alloys
Containing active metals, e.g., titanium or vanadium. Used for brazing non-metallic materials, e.g. graphite or ceramics.

Role of elements
Element	Role	Volatility	Corrosion resistance	Cost	incompatibility	description
Silver	structural, wetting	volatile		expensive		Enhances capillary flow, improves corrosion resistance of less-noble alloys, worsens corrosion resistance of gold and palladium. Relatively expensive. High vapor pressure, problematic in vacuum brazing. Wets copper. Does not wet nickel and iron. Reduces melting point of many alloys, including gold-copper.
Copper	structural				ammonia	Good mechanical properties. Often used with silver. Dissolves and wets nickel. Somewhat dissolves and wets iron. Copper-rich alloys sensitive to stress cracking in presence of ammonia.
Zinc	structural, melting, wetting	volatile	low	cheap	Ni	Lowers melting point. Often used with copper. Susceptible to corrosion. Improves wetting on ferrous metals and on nickel alloys. Compatible with aluminum. High vapor pressure, produces somewhat toxic fumes, requires ventilation; highly volatile above 500 °C. At high temperatures may boil and create voids. Prone to selective leaching in some environments, which may cause joint failure. Traces of bismuth and beryllium together with tin or zinc in aluminum-based braze destabilize oxide film on aluminum, facilitating its wetting. High affinity to oxygen, promotes wetting of copper in air by reduction of the cuprous oxide surface film. Less such benefit in furnace brazing with controlled atmosphere. Embrittles nickel. High levels of zinc may result in a brittle alloy. Prone to interfacial corrosion in contact with stainless steel in wet and humid environments. Unsuitable for furnace brazing due to volatility.
Aluminum	structural, active				Fe	Usual base for brazing aluminum and its alloys. Embrittles ferrous alloys.
Gold	structural, wetting		excellent	very expensive		Excellent corrosion resistance. Very expensive. Wets most metals.
Palladium	structural		excellent	very expensive		Excellent corrosion resistance, though less than gold. Higher mechanical strength than gold. Good high-temperature strength. Very expensive, though less than gold. Makes the joint less prone to fail due to intergranular penetration when brazing alloys of nickel, molybdenum, or tungsten. Increases high-temperature strength of gold-based alloys. Improves high-temperature strength and corrosion resistance of gold-copper alloys. Forms solid solutions with most engineering metals, does not form brittle intermetallics. High oxidation resistance at high temperatures, especially Pd-Ni alloys.
Cadmium	structural, wetting, melting	volatile			toxic	Lowers melting point, improves fluidity. Toxic. Produces toxic fumes, requires ventilation. High affinity to oxygen, promotes wetting of copper in air by reduction of the cuprous oxide surface film. Less such benefit in furnace brazing with controlled atmosphere. Allows reducing silver content of Ag-Cu-Zn alloys. Replaced by tin in more modern alloys. In EU since December 2011 allowed only for aerospace and military use.
Lead	structural, melting					Lowers melting point. Toxic. Produces toxic fumes, requires ventilation.
Tin	structural, melting, wetting					Lowers melting point, improves fluidity. Broadens melting range. Can be used with copper, with which it forms bronze. Improves wetting of many difficult-to-wet metals, e.g. stainless steels and tungsten carbide. Traces of bismuth and beryllium together with tin or zinc in aluminum-based braze destabilize oxide film on aluminum, facilitating its wetting. Low solubility in zinc, which limits its content in zinc-bearing alloys.
Bismuth	trace additive					Lowers melting point. May disrupt surface oxides. Traces of bismuth and beryllium together with tin or zinc in aluminum-based braze destabilize oxide film on aluminum, facilitating its wetting.
Beryllium	trace additive				toxic	Traces of bismuth and beryllium together with tin or zinc in aluminum-based braze destabilize oxide film on aluminum, facilitating its wetting.
Nickel	structural, wetting		high		Zn, S	Strong, corrosion-resistant. Impedes flow of the melt. Addition to gold-copper alloys improves ductility and resistance to creep at high temperatures. Addition to silver allows wetting of silver-tungsten alloys and improves bond strength. Improves wetting of copper-based brazes. Improves ductility of gold-copper brazes. Improves mechanical properties and corrosion resistance of silver-copper-zinc brazes. Nickel content offsets brittleness induced by diffusion of aluminum when brazing aluminum-containing alloys, e.g. aluminum bronzes. In some alloys increases mechanical properties and corrosion resistance, by a combination of solid solution strengthening, grain refinement, and segregation on fillet surface and in grain boundaries, where it forms a corrosion-resistant layer. Extensive intersolubility with iron, chromium, manganese, and others; can severely erode such alloys. Embrittled by zinc, many other low melting point metals, and sulfur.
Chromium	structural		high			Corrosion-resistant. Increases high-temperature corrosion resistance and strength of gold-based alloys. Added to copper and nickel to increase corrosion resistance of them and their alloys. Wets oxides, carbides, and graphite; frequently a major alloy component for high-temperature brazing of such materials. Impairs wetting by gold-nickel alloys, which can be compensated for by addition of boron.
Manganese	structural	volatile	good	cheap		High vapor pressure, unsuitable for vacuum brazing. In gold-based alloys increases ductility. Increases corrosion resistance of copper and nickel alloys. Improves high-temperature strength and corrosion resistance of gold-copper alloys. Higher manganese content may aggravate tendency to liquation. Manganese in some alloys may tend to cause porosity in fillets. Tends to react with graphite molds and jigs. Oxidizes easily, requires flux. Lowers melting point of high-copper brazes. Improves mechanical properties and corrosion resistance of silver-copper-zinc brazes. Cheap, even less expensive than zinc. Part of the Cu-Zn-Mn system is brittle, some ratios can not be used. In some alloys increases mechanical properties and corrosion resistance, by a combination of solid solution strengthening, grain refinement, and segregation on fillet surface and in grain boundaries, where it forms a corrosion-resistant layer. Facilitates wetting of cast iron due to its ability to dissolve carbon. Improves conditions for brazing of carbides.
Molybdenum	structural		good			Increases high-temperature corrosion and strength of gold-based alloys. Increases ductility of gold-based alloys, promotes their wetting of refractory materials, namely carbides and graphite. When present in alloys being joined, may destabilize the surface oxide layer (by oxidizing and then volatilizing) and facilitate wetting.
Cobalt	structural		good			Good high-temperature properties and corrosion resistance. In nuclear applications can absorb neutrons and build up cobalt-60, a potent gamma radiation emitter.
Magnesium	volatile O_{2} getter	volatile				Addition to aluminum makes the alloy suitable for vacuum brazing. Volatile, though less than zinc. Vaporization promotes wetting by removing oxides from the surface, vapors act as getter for oxygen in the furnace atmosphere.
Indium	melting, wetting			expensive		Lowers melting point. Improves wetting of ferrous alloys by copper-silver alloys. Suitable for joining parts that will be later coated by titanium nitride.
Carbon	melting					Lowers melting point. Can form carbides. Can diffuse to the base metal, resulting in higher remelt temperature, potentially allowing step-brazing with the same alloy. At above 0.1% worsens corrosion resistance of nickel alloys. Trace amounts present in stainless steel may facilitate reduction of surface chromium(III) oxide in vacuum and allow fluxless brazing. Diffusion away from the braze increases its remelt temperature; exploited in diffusion brazing.
Silicon	melting, wetting				Ni	Lowers melting point. Can form silicides. Improves wetting of copper-based brazes. Promotes flow. Causes intergranular embrittlement of nickel alloys. Rapidly diffuses into the base metals. Diffusion away from the braze increases its remelt temperature; exploited in diffusion brazing.
Germanium	structural, melting			expensive		Lowers melting point. Expensive. For special applications. May create brittle phases.
Boron	melting, wetting				Ni	Lowers melting point. Can form hard and brittle borides. Unsuitable for nuclear reactors, as boron is a potent neutron absorber and therefore acts as a neutron poison. Fast diffusion to the base metals. Can diffuse to the base metal, resulting in higher remelt temperature, potentially allowing step-brazing with the same alloy. Can erode some base materials or penetrate between grain boundaries of many heat-resistant structural alloys, degrading their mechanical properties. Causes intergranular embrittlement of nickel alloys. Improves wetting of/by some alloys, can be added to Au-Ni-Cr alloy to compensate for wetting loss by chromium addition. In low concentrations improves wetting and lowers melting point of nickel brazes. Rapidly diffuses to base materials, may lower their melting point; especially a concern when brazing thin materials. Diffusion away from the braze increases its remelt temperature; exploited in diffusion brazing.
Mischmetal	trace additive					in amount of about 0.08%, can be used to substitute boron where boron would have detrimental effects.
Cerium	trace additive					in trace quantities, improves fluidity of brazes. Particularly useful for alloys of four or more components, where the other additives compromise flow and spreading.
Strontium	trace additive					in trace quantities, refines the grain structure of aluminum-based alloys.
Phosphorus	deoxidizer				H_{2}S, SO_{2}, Ni, Fe, Co	Lowers melting point. Deoxidizer, decomposes copper oxide; phosphorus-bearing alloys can be used on copper without flux. Does not decompose zinc oxide, so flux is needed for brass. Forms brittle phosphides with some metals, e.g. nickel (Ni_{3}P) and iron, phosphorus alloys unsuitable for brazing alloys bearing iron, nickel or cobalt in amount above 3%. The phosphides segregate at grain boundaries and cause intergranular embrittlement. (Sometimes the brittle joint is actually desired, though. Fragmentation grenades can be brazed with phosphorus bearing alloy to produce joints that shatter easily at detonation.) Avoid in environments with presence of sulfur dioxide (e.g. paper mills) and hydrogen sulfide (e.g. sewers, or close to volcanoes); the phosphorus-rich phase rapidly corrodes in presence of sulfur and the joint fails. Phosphorus can be also present as an impurity introduced from e.g. electroplating baths. In low concentrations improves wetting and lowers melting point of nickel brazes. Diffusion away from the braze increases its remelt temperature; exploited in diffusion brazing.
Lithium	deoxidizer					Deoxidizer. Eliminates the need for flux with some materials. Lithium oxide formed by reaction with the surface oxides is easily displaced by molten braze alloy.
Titanium	structural, active					Most commonly used active metal. Few percents added to Ag-Cu alloys facilitate wetting of ceramics, e.g. silicon nitride. Most metals, except few (namely silver, copper and gold), form brittle phases with titanium. When brazing ceramics, like other active metals, titanium reacts with them and forms a complex layer on their surface, which in turn is wettable by the silver-copper braze. Wets oxides, carbides, and graphite; frequently a major alloy component for high-temperature brazing of such materials.
Zirconium	structural, active					Wets oxides, carbides, and graphite; frequently a major alloy component for high-temperature brazing of such materials.
Hafnium	active					
Vanadium	structural, active					Promotes wetting of alumina ceramics by gold-based alloys.
Sulfur	impurity					Compromises integrity of nickel alloys. Can enter the joints from residues of lubricants, grease or paint. Forms brittle nickel sulfide (Ni_{3}S_{2}) that segregates at grain boundaries and cause intergranular failure.

Some additives and impurities act at very low levels. Both positive and negative effects can be observed. Strontium at levels of 0.01% refines grain structure of aluminum. Beryllium and bismuth at similar levels help disrupt the passivation layer of aluminum oxide and promote wetting. Carbon at 0.1% impairs corrosion resistance of nickel alloys. Aluminum can embrittle mild steel at 0.001%, phosphorus at 0.01%.

In some cases, especially for vacuum brazing, high-purity metals and alloys are used. 99.99% and 99.999% purity levels are available commercially.

Care must be taken to not introduce deleterious impurities from joint contamination or by dissolution of the base metals during brazing.

=== Melting behavior ===
Alloys with larger span of solidus/liquidus temperatures tend to melt through a "mushy" state, during which the alloy is a mixture of solid and liquid material. Some alloys show tendency to liquation, separation of the liquid from the solid portion; for these the heating through the melting range must be sufficiently fast to avoid this effect. Some alloys show extended plastic range, when only a small portion of the alloy is liquid and most of the material melts at the upper temperature range; these are suitable for bridging large gaps and for forming fillets. Highly fluid alloys are suitable for penetrating deep into narrow gaps and for brazing tight joints with narrow tolerances but are not suitable for filling larger gaps. Alloys with wider melting range are less sensitive to non-uniform clearances.

When the brazing temperature is suitably high, brazing and heat treatment can be done in a single operation simultaneously.

Eutectic alloys melt at single temperature, without mushy region. Eutectic alloys have superior spreading; non-eutectics in the mushy region have high viscosity and at the same time attack the base metal, with correspondingly lower spreading force. Fine grain size gives eutectics both increased strength and increased ductility. Highly accurate melting temperature lets joining process be performed only slightly above the alloy's melting point. On solidifying, there is no mushy state where the alloy appears solid but is not yet; the chance of disturbing the joint by manipulation in such state is reduced (assuming the alloy did not significantly change its properties by dissolving the base metal). Eutectic behavior is especially beneficial for solders.

Metals with fine grain structure before melting provide superior wetting to metals with large grains. Alloying additives (e.g. strontium to aluminum) can be added to refine grain structure, and the preforms or foils can be prepared by rapid quenching. Very rapid quenching may provide amorphous metal structure, which possess further advantages.

=== Interaction with base metals ===
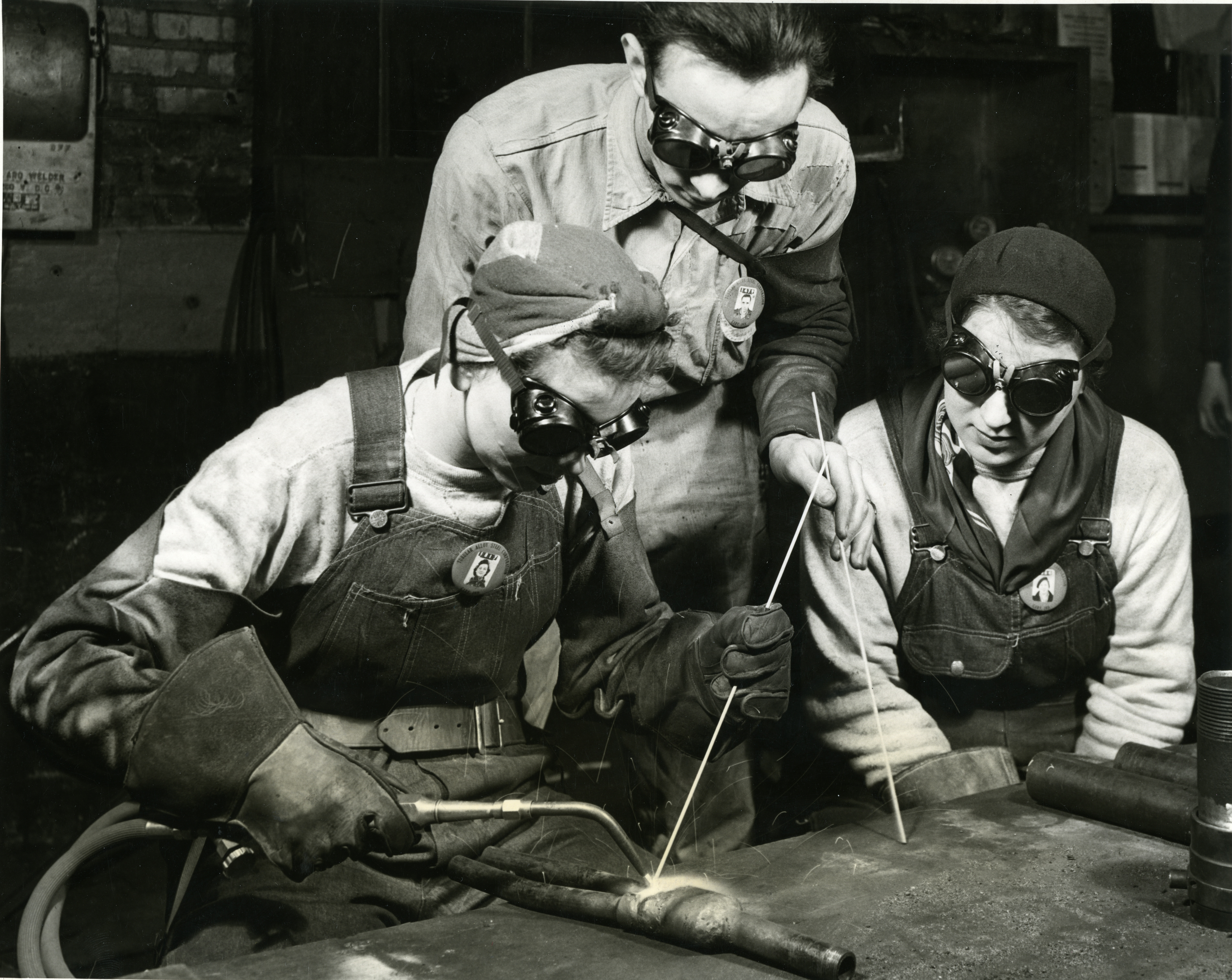
Brazing at the Gary Tubular Steel Plant, 1943

For successful wetting, the base metal must be at least partially soluble in at least one component of the brazing alloy. The molten alloy therefore tends to attack the base metal and dissolve it, slightly changing its composition in the process. The composition change is reflected in the change of the alloy's melting point and the corresponding change of fluidity. For example, some alloys dissolve both silver and copper; dissolved silver lowers their melting point and increases fluidity, copper has the opposite effect.

The melting point change can be exploited. As the remelt temperature can be increased by enriching the alloy with dissolved base metal, step brazing using the same braze can be possible.

Alloys that do not significantly attack the base metals are more suitable for brazing thin sections.

Nonhomogenous microstructure of the braze may cause non-uniform melting and localized erosions of the base metal.

Wetting of base metals can be improved by adding a suitable metal to the alloy. Tin facilitates wetting of iron, nickel, and many other alloys. Copper wets ferrous metals that silver does not attack, copper-silver alloys can therefore braze steels silver alone won't wet. Zinc improves wetting of ferrous metals, indium as well. Aluminum improves wetting of aluminum alloys. For wetting of ceramics, reactive metals capable of forming chemical compounds with the ceramic (e.g. titanium, vanadium, zirconium...) can be added to the braze.

Dissolution of base metals can cause detrimental changes in the brazing alloy. For example, aluminum dissolved from aluminum bronzes can embrittle the braze; addition of nickel to the braze can offset this.

The effect works both ways; there can be detrimental interactions between the braze alloy and the base metal. Presence of phosphorus in the braze alloy leads to formation of brittle phosphides of iron and nickel, phosphorus-containing alloys are therefore unsuitable for brazing nickel and ferrous alloys. Boron tends to diffuse into the base metals, especially along the grain boundaries, and may form brittle borides. Carbon can negatively influence some steels.

Care must be taken to avoid galvanic corrosion between the braze and the base metal, and especially between dissimilar base metals being brazed together. Formation of brittle intermetallic compounds on the alloy interface can cause joint failure. This is discussed more in-depth with solders.

The potentially detrimental phases may be distributed evenly through the volume of the alloy, or be concentrated on the braze-base interface. A thick layer of interfacial intermetallics is usually considered detrimental due to its commonly low fracture toughness and other sub-par mechanical properties. In some situations, e.g. die attaching, it however does not matter much as silicon chips are not typically subjected to mechanical abuse.

On wetting, brazes may liberate elements from the base metal. For example, aluminum-silicon braze wets silicon nitride, dissociates the surface so it can react with silicon, and liberates nitrogen, which may create voids along the joint interface and lower its strength. Titanium-containing nickel-gold braze wets silicon nitride and reacts with its surface, forming titanium nitride and liberating silicon; silicon then forms brittle nickel silicides and eutectic gold-silicon phase; the resulting joint is weak and melts at much lower temperature than may be expected.

Metals may diffuse from one base alloy to the other one, causing embrittlement or corrosion. An example is diffusion of aluminum from aluminum bronze to a ferrous alloy when joining these. A diffusion barrier, e.g. a copper layer (e.g. in a trimet strip), can be used.

A sacrificial layer of a noble metal can be used on the base metal as an oxygen barrier, preventing formation of oxides and facilitating fluxless brazing. During brazing, the noble metal layer dissolves in the filler metal. Copper or nickel plating of stainless steels performs the same function.

In brazing copper, a reducing atmosphere (or even a reducing flame) may react with the oxygen residues in the metal, which are present as cuprous oxide inclusions, and cause hydrogen embrittlement. The hydrogen present in the flame or atmosphere at high temperature reacts with the oxide, yielding metallic copper and water vapour, steam. The steam bubbles exert high pressure in the metal structure, leading to cracks and joint porosity. Oxygen-free copper is not sensitive to this effect, however the most readily available grades, e.g. electrolytic copper or high-conductivity copper, are. The embrittled joint may then fail catastrophically without any previous sign of deformation or deterioration.

== Flux ==
Unless brazing operations are contained within an inert or reducing atmosphere environment (i.e. nitrogen), a flux such as borax is required to prevent oxides from forming while the metal is heated. The flux also serves the purpose of cleaning any contamination left on the brazing surfaces. Flux can be applied in any number of forms including flux paste, liquid, powder or pre-made brazing pastes that combine flux with filler metal powder. Flux can also be applied using brazing rods with a coating of flux, or a flux core. In either case, the flux flows into the joint when applied to the heated joint and is displaced by the molten filler metal entering the joint. Excess flux should be removed when the cycle is completed because flux left in the joint can lead to corrosion, impede joint inspection, and prevent further surface finishing operations. Phosphorus-containing brazing alloys can be self-fluxing when joining copper to copper. Fluxes are generally selected based on their performance on particular base metals. To be effective, the flux must be chemically compatible with both the base metal and the filler metal being used. Self-fluxing phosphorus filler alloys produce brittle phosphides if used on iron or nickel. As a general rule, longer brazing cycles should use less active fluxes than short brazing operations.

== Atmosphere ==
As brazing work requires high temperatures, oxidation of the metal surface occurs in an oxygen-containing atmosphere. This may necessitate the use of an atmospheric environment other than air. The commonly used atmospheres are:

Air
Simple and economical. Many materials susceptible to oxidation and buildup of scale. Acid cleaning bath or mechanical cleaning can be used to remove the oxidation after work. Flux counteracts the oxidation, but may weaken the joint.
Combusted fuel gas
Low hydrogen, AWS type 1, "exothermic generated atmospheres". 87% N_{2}, 11–12% CO_{2}, 5-1% CO, 5-1% H_{2}. For silver, copper-phosphorus and copper-zinc filler metals. For brazing copper and brass.
Combusted fuel gas
Decarburizing, AWS type 2, "endothermic generated atmospheres. 70–71% N_{2}, 5–6% CO_{2}, 9–10% CO, 14–15% H_{2}. For copper, silver, copper-phosphorus and copper-zinc filler metals. For brazing copper, brass, nickel alloys, Monel, medium carbon steels.
Combusted fuel gas
Dried, AWS type 3, "endothermic generated atmospheres. 73–75% N_{2}, 10–11% CO, 15–16% H_{2}. For copper, silver, copper-phosphorus and copper-zinc filler metals. For brazing copper, brass, low-nickel alloys, Monel, medium and high carbon steels.
Combusted fuel gas
Dried, decarburizing, AWS type 4. 41–45% N_{2}, 17–19% CO, 38–40% H_{2}. For copper, silver, copper-phosphorus and copper-zinc filler metals. For brazing copper, brass, low-nickel alloys, medium and high carbon steels.
Ammonia
AWS type 5, also called forming gas. Dissociated ammonia (75% hydrogen, 25% nitrogen) can be used for many types of brazing and annealing. Inexpensive. For copper, silver, nickel, copper-phosphorus and copper-zinc filler metals. For brazing copper, brass, nickel alloys, Monel, medium and high carbon steels and chromium alloys.
Nitrogen+hydrogen
Cryogenic or purified (AWS type 6A). 70–99% N_{2}, 1–30% H_{2}. For copper, silver, nickel, copper-phosphorus and copper-zinc filler metals.
Nitrogen+hydrogen+carbon monoxide
Cryogenic or purified (AWS type 6B). 70–99% N_{2}, 2–20% H_{2}, 1–10% CO. For copper, silver, nickel, copper-phosphorus and copper-zinc filler metals. For brazing copper, brass, low-nickel alloys, medium and high carbon steels.
Nitrogen
Cryogenic or purified (AWS type 6C). Non-oxidizing, economical. At high temperatures can react with some metals, e.g. certain steels, forming nitrides. For copper, silver, nickel, copper-phosphorus and copper-zinc filler metals. For brazing copper, brass, low-nickel alloys, Monel, medium and high carbon steels.
Hydrogen
AWS type 7. Strong deoxidizer, highly thermally conductive. Can be used for copper brazing and annealing steel. May cause hydrogen embrittlement to some alloys. For copper, silver, nickel, copper-phosphorus and copper-zinc filler metals. For brazing copper, brass, nickel alloys, Monel, medium and high carbon steels and chromium alloys, cobalt alloys, tungsten alloys, and carbides.
Inorganic vapors
Various volatile fluorides, AWS type 8. Special purpose. Can be mixed with atmospheres AWS 1–5 to replace flux. Used for silver-brazing of brasses.
Noble gas
Usually argon, AWS type 9. Non-oxidizing, more expensive than nitrogen. Inert. Parts must be very clean, gas must be pure. For copper, silver, nickel, copper-phosphorus and copper-zinc filler metals. For brazing copper, brass, nickel alloys, Monel, medium and high carbon steels chromium alloys, titanium, zirconium, hafnium.
Noble gas+hydrogen
AWS type 9A.
Vacuum
Requires evacuating the work chamber. Expensive. Unsuitable (or requires special care) for metals with high vapor pressure, e.g. silver, zinc, phosphorus, cadmium, and manganese. Used for highest-quality joints, for e.g. aerospace applications.

== Preforms ==
A brazing preform is a high quality, precision metal stamping used for a variety of joining applications in manufacturing electronic devices and systems. Typical brazing preform uses include attaching electronic circuitry, packaging electronic devices, providing good thermal and electrical conductivity, and providing an interface for electronic connections. Square, rectangular and disc shaped brazing preforms are commonly used to attach electronic components containing silicon dies to a substrate such as a printed circuit board. Rectangular frame shaped preforms are often required for the construction of electronic packages while washer shaped brazing preforms are typically utilized to attach lead wires and hermetic feed-throughs to electronic circuits and packages. Some preforms are also used in diodes, rectifiers, optoelectronic devices and components packaging.

== Safety ==
Brazing may entail exposure to hazardous chemical fumes. The National Institute for Occupational Safety and Health in the United States recommends that exposure to these fumes is controlled to levels below the allowed exposure limit.

== See also ==
- Braze-on
- CuproBraze
- Petit chien à bélière
- Soldering
